This is a list of foreign players in the Liga I, which commenced play in 1909. The following players must meet both of the following two criteria:
Have played at least one Liga I game. Players who were signed by Liga I clubs, but only played in lower league, cup and/or European games, or did not play in any competitive games at all, are not included.
Are considered foreign, i.e., outside Romania determined by the following:
A player is considered foreign if he is not eligible to play for the national teams of Romania.
More specifically,
If a player has been capped on international level, the national team is used; if he has been capped by more than one country, the highest level (or the most recent) team is used. These include Romanian players with dual citizenship. Players who played for Romania but came as foreign players (such as István Avar) are also listed.
If a player has not been capped on international level, his country of birth is used, except those who were born abroad from Romanian parents or moved to Romania at a young age, and those who clearly indicated to have switched their nationality to another nation.

Clubs listed are those that the player has played at least one Liga I game for.

Seasons listed are those that the player has played at least one Liga I game in. Note that seasons, not calendar years, are used. For example, "1992–1995" indicates that the player has played in every season from 1992–1993 to 1994–1995, but not necessarily every calendar year from 1992 to 1995.

In bold: players that have played at least one Liga I game in the current season (2022–2023) and the clubs they've played for. They include players that have subsequently left the club, but do not include current players of a Liga I club that have not played a Liga I game in the current season.

Albania

Donaldo Açka – Politehnica Iași – 2020–2021
Roland Agalliu – FC Universitatea Craiova, Oțelul Galați – 1990–1993
Alket Alcani – Gloria Bistrița – 2003–2004
Naser Aliji – Dinamo București, FC Voluntari – 2018–2019, 2022–
Elis Bakaj – Dinamo București – 2010–2012
Taulant Baki – Petrolul Ploiești – 1999–2000
Idriz Batha – UTA Arad – 2021–
Amir Bilali – Academica Clinceni – 2020–2022
Ilir Bozhiqi – FC Brașov – 1991–1995
Agim Canaj – FC Brașov – 1991–1994
Elton Ceno – Steaua București – 1998–2000
Sulejman Demollari – Dinamo București – 1991–1995
Dashnor Dume – Oțelul Galați – 1993–1994
Albert Duro – Steaua București, Naţional București – 1998–2001, 2002–2004
Realdo Fili – FC Botoșani – 2019–2022
Sandër Leon Grunasi – Politehnica Timișoara – 1995–1996
Edon Hasani – Ceahlăul Piatra Neamț, ACS Poli Timișoara – 2013–2014
Erion Hoxhallari – UTA Arad – 2022–
Elvis Kabashi – Dinamo București – 2018–2019
Arben Kokalari – Oțelul Galați – 1991–1993
Alket Kruja – Gloria Bistrița – 2003–2004
Fabian Lokaj – Gaz Metan Mediaș – 2017–2018
Azdren Llullaku – Gaz Metan Mediaș, CSMS Iași, Astra Giurgiu – 2012–2017, 2018–2019
Altin Masati – Oțelul Galați, FC Onești – 1993–1994, 1998–2000 
Arben Minga – FC Brașov, Dacia Unirea Brăila – 1991–1993
Perlat Musta – Dinamo București – 1991–1994
Mërgim Neziri – FC Botoșani – 2015–2016
Enriko Papa – FC Botoșani – 2018–2022
Leonard Perloshi – Petrolul Ploiești – 1999–2000
Simon Rrumbullaku – UTA Arad, Chindia Târgoviște – 2020–2022
Kamer Qaka – Politehnica Iași, Steaua București, CS Universitatea Craiova – 2017–2020
Kristi Vangjeli – Astra Giurgiu – 2016–2017
Edmond Voda – Oțelul Galați – 1993–1994

Algeria
Rachid Aït-Atmane – Dinamo București – 2018–2019
Najib Ammari – CFR Cluj, Dunărea Călărași, Viitorul Constanța – 2013–2014, 2018–2020
Rachid Bouhenna – Sepsi Sfântu Gheorghe, CFR Cluj, FCSB – 2019–
Liassine Cadamuro – Concordia Chiajna – 2018–2019
Jugurtha Hamroun – Oțelul Galați, Steaua București – 2014–2017
Billel Omrani – CFR Cluj – 2016–2022
Aymen Tahar – Gaz Metan Mediaș, Steaua București – 2011–2017
Mourad Satli – Petrolul Ploiești, FC Voluntari – 2014–2015, 2020–2021
Karim Ziani – Petrolul Ploiești – 2015–2016

Angola
Aguinaldo – Politehnica Iași – 2018–2019
Alexander Christovão – Dinamo București – 2018–2019
Dédé – Politehnica Timișoara – 2009–2010
Carlos Fernandes – Steaua București – 2005–2007
Dominique Kivuvu – CFR Cluj – 2010–2012
Luís Lourenço – Corona Brașov – 2013–2014
Zé Kalanga – Dinamo București – 2006–2007, 2008–2010

Argentina

Matías Abelairas – FC Vaslui – 2013–2014
Juan Bauza – FC U Craiova – 2021–
Elías Bazzi – Național București, Argeș Pitești, Dinamo București, Universitatea Cluj – 2004–2007, 2008–2009, 2010–2012
Pablo Brandán – Unirea Urziceni, Steaua București, CS Universitatea Craiova, ASA Târgu Mureș, Viitorul Constanța – 2007–2012, 2014–2017
Enzo Bruno – Unirea Alba Iulia – 2009–2010
Gonzalo Cabrera – FC Botoșani – 2015–2016
Fernando Cafasso – Gloria Bistrița – 2010–2011, 2012–2013
Danilo Carando – Astra Ploiești – 2009–2010
Juan Cascini – FC Botoșani, Academica Clinceni, UTA Arad – 2019–
Lucas Chacana – Politehnica Iaşi – 2019–2021
Nicolás Chiesa – Politehnica Iaşi – 2004–2005
Esteban Ciaccheri – FC Botoșani – 2017–2018
Ramiro Costa – ASA Târgu Mureș – 2015–2016
Tomás Costa – CFR Cluj – 2010–2011
Walter Cubilla – Gloria Bistrița – 2012–2013
Emmanuel Culio – CFR Cluj – 2007–2011, 2017–2020, 2021–2022
Gastón Díaz – Ceahlăul Piatra Neamț – 2006–2007
Tomás Díaz – Sepsi Sfântu Gheorghe, Chindia Târgoviște – 2019–2021
David Distéfano – FC Brașov, Astra Giurgiu, Pandurii Târgu Jiu – 2010–2014
Jonathan Domínguez – FC Brașov – 2011–2012
Sebastián Dubarbier – CFR Cluj – 2007–2010
Cristian Fabbiani – CFR Cluj – 2007–2009
Mariano Fernandez – Dinamo București – 2007–2008
Ezequiel Filipetto – Pandurii Târgu Jiu – 2015–2016
Paolo Frangipane – CFR Cluj – 2008–2009
Pablo Gaitán – Politehnica Iaşi – 2020–2021
Juan Pablo Garat – Dinamo București – 2010–2011
Cristian García – Concordia Chiajna – 2015–2016
José Luis García – Politehnica Timișoara, Gloria Buzău – 2008–2009
Lucas Garcia – Ceahlăul Piatra Neamț – 2011–2015
Alejandro Gavatorta – Politehnica Iași – 2004–2007, 2008–2009
Maximiliano Giusti – Pandurii Târgu Jiu – 2013–2014
Nicolás Gorobsov – ACS Poli Timișoara, ASA Târgu Mureș, Concordia Chiajna, FC Voluntari – 2013–2017,  2018–2020
Manuel de Iriondo – Politehnica Iași – 2019–2021
Alejandro Kruchowski – Astra Ploiești – 2009–2010
Elvio Martínez – Politehnica Timișoara – 2007–2008
Patricio Matricardi – FC Hermannstadt,  Gaz Metan Mediaș, FC Voluntari – 2020–
Osvaldo Miranda – Dinamo București, Astra Ploiești – 2007–2012
Franco Mussis – FC Botoșani – 2022–
Gustavo Oberman – CFR Cluj – 2008–2009
Maximiliano Oliva – Dinamo București, ACS Poli Timișoara – 2016–2018
Gustavo Paruolo – Politehnica Iași – 2006–2009
Juan Pablo Passaglia – Politehnica Iași, UTA Arad, Chindia Târgoviște – 2019–
Sixto Peralta – CFR Cluj – 2007–2012
Matías Pérez – Rapid București – 2021–2022
Leonel Pierce – FC Botoșani – 2019–2020
Sebastián Pol – CS Mioveni – 2007–2008
Cristian Sánchez Prette – CFR Cluj – 2008–2009
Franco Razzotti – FC Vaslui – 2013–2014
David Reano – Gloria Bistrița – 2012–2013
Jonathan Rodríguez – FC Botoșani, CFR Cluj, Dinamo București, Sepsi Sfântu Gheorghe – 2017–
Diego Ruiz – CFR Cluj, FCM Târgu Mureș – 2007–2012
Martin Šarić – Politehnica Iași – 2005–2007
Diego Sevillano – Oțelul Galați – 2013–2014
Juan Sánchez Sotelo – Rapid București – 2011–2012
Abel Valdez – Astra Ploiești – 2009–2010
Julián Velázquez – Gaz Metan Mediaș – 2014–2015
Luciano Vella – Rapid București – 2008–2009
Gabriel Viglianti – Oțelul Galați – 2007–2013

Armenia
Apoula Edel – Rapid București – 2006–2007
Arman Karamyan – Rapid București, FC Brașov, Gloria Bistrița, Ceahlăul Piatra Neamț, Politehnica Timișoara, Steaua București, Unirea Urziceni – 2004–2011
Artavazd Karamyan – Rapid București, Politehnica Timișoara, Steaua București, Unirea Urziceni – 2004–2011
Romik Khachatryan – Unirea Urziceni, Universitatea Cluj – 2006–2008
Marian Zeciu – Oțelul Galați, Ceahlăul Piatra Neamț – 2004–2007

Australia

Tomislav Arčaba – Gloria Buzău, Internațional Curtea de Argeș – 2008–2010
Michael Baird – FC Universitatea Craiova – 2006–2010
Jacob Burns – Unirea Urziceni – 2007–2009
Anthony Carter – CFR Cluj – 2014–2016
Spase Dilevski – FC Universitatea Craiova – 2007–2011
Ryan Griffiths – Național București, Rapid București – 2004–2007
Daniel McBreen – FC Universitatea Craiova – 2002–2004
Jonathan McKain – Naţional București, Politehnica Timișoara – 2003–2008
Josh Mitchell – FC Universitatea Craiova – 2006–2010
Srećko Mitrović – Politehnica Iași – 2006–2007
Levent Osman – Politehnica Timișoara – 2002–2003
Joshua Rose – FC Universitatea Craiova – 2006–2010
Wayne Srhoj – Național București, Politehnica Timișoara – 2004–2008
Aleksandar Šušnjar – Gaz Metan Mediaș – 2016–2017
Michael Thwaite – Național București – 2004–2006

Austria
Serkan Çiftçi – Oțelul Galați – 2014–2015
Mario Ebenhofer – FC Botoșani – 2019–2020
Martin Fraisl – FC Botoșani – 2018–2019
Ronald Gërçaliu – Universitatea Cluj – 2013–2014
Petar Gluhakovic – Dinamo București – 2021–2022
Armin Gremsl – FC U Craiova – 2021–2022
Hidajet Hankič – FC Botoșani – 2019–2021
Martin Harrer – FC Voluntari – 2019–2020
Marcel Holzmann – FC Botoșani, Sepsi Sfântu Gheorghe, Academica Clinceni – 2018–2022
Mladen Jutrić – Academica Clinceni – 2020–2022
Aleksa Marković – Sepsi Sfântu Gheorghe – 2020–2021
Daniel Offenbacher – FC Hermannstadt – 2018–2020
Daniel Sikorski – Gaz Metan Mediaș – 2016–2017
Toni Tipurić – Concordia Chiajna – 2017–2018
Stipe Vučur – FCSB – 2021–2022

Azerbaijan
Elhad Naziri – Petrolul Ploiești – 2012–2014

Belarus
Pavel Byahanski – Oțelul Galați – 2007–2008
Uladzimir Haew – Dinamo București – 2003–2007
Alyaksandr Karnitsky – Sepsi Sfântu Gheorghe – 2018–2019
Vasily Khomutovsky – Steaua București, Petrolul Ploiești – 2003–2006, 2011–2013

Belgium
Manuel Angiulli – Politehnica Iași – 2020–2021
William Baeten – FC U Craiova – 2021–
Roberto Bisconti – Rapid București – 2002–2003
Alessio Carlone – Politehnica Iași, FC Botoșani – 2019–2020
Jimmy De Jonghe – Argeș Pitești – 2020–2022
Emmerik De Vriese – Gaz Metan Mediaș – 2017–2018
Kino Delorge – Dinamo București – 2018–2019
Grégory Delwarte – Dinamo București – 2003–2004
Emmanuel Godfroid – Rapid București – 2002–2005
Jérémy Huyghebaert – FC U Craiova – 2021–
Nathan Kabasele – FC Voluntari – 2018–2019
Philippe Léonard – Rapid București – 2007–2008
Alexander Maes – Argeș Pitești – 2020–2021
François Marquet – FC U Craiova – 2021–
Ayrton Mboko – Academica Clinceni, Farul Constanța – 2021–
Pieter Merlier – Universitatea Cluj, FC Universitatea Craiova – 2007–2008, 2009–2010
Martin Remacle – FC Voluntari, FC Botoșani, Universitatea Cluj – 2020–
Rubenilson – FC Universitatea Craiova – 2004–2005
Sekou Sidibe – FC U Craiova – 2021–
Jeanvion Yulu-Matondo – Oțelul Galați – 2014–2015
Benjamin Van Durmen – FC U Craiova – 2021–
Floriano Vanzo – Politehnica Iași, Sepsi Sfântu Gheorghe – 2020–2022

Benin
Désiré Azankpo – Dinamo București – 2021–2022
David Kiki – Farul Constanța – 2022–
Djiman Koukou – Astra Giurgiu – 2018–2019

Bolivia
Luis Alí – FC Hermannstadt – 2018–2019
Nelson Cabrera – CFR Cluj – 2009–2010
Gualberto Mojica – CFR Cluj, Petrolul Ploiești – 2006–2007, 2012–2013
Ricardo Pedriel – Steaua București – 2008–2009

Bosnia and Herzegovina

Admir Aganović – Gaz Metan Mediaș – 2010–2011
Esmir Ahmetović – ACS Poli Timișoara – 2013–2014
Fahrudin Aličković – CFR Cluj – 2004–2005
Zdenko Baotić – Oțelul Galați – 2009–2010
Gordan Bunoza – Dinamo București, Pandurii Târgu Jiu – 2014–2017
Azer Bušuladžić – Dinamo București – 2016–2018
Nusmir Fajić – CS Universitatea Craiova – 2016–2017
Jovan Golić – CS Turnu Severin – 2012–2013
Bojan Golubović – Ceahlăul Piatra Neamț, Politehnica Iași, Steaua București, Gaz Metan Mediaș, FC Botoșani – 2011–2018
Branko Grahovac – Oțelul Galați, Politehnica Iași – 2009–2013, 2014–2017
Daniel Graovac – Astra Giurgiu, CFR Cluj – 2019–
Adnan Gušo – FC Universitatea Craiova, Dinamo București, Argeș Pitești, Pandurii Târgu Jiu – 2002–2008
Mirza Hasanović – CS Turnu Severin – 2012–2013
Damir Ibrić – Concordia Chiajna – 2012–2013
Petar Jovanović – FC Vaslui, Politehnica Iași, CSMS Iași, Universitatea Cluj – 2005–2009, 2011–2013, 2014–2015
Boris Keča – Național București, FC Brașov, Steaua București, Pandurii Târgu Jiu, Argeș Pitești – 1999–2007
Elvir Koljić – CS Universitatea Craiova – 2018–
Sulejman Krpić – Astra Giurgiu – 2020–2021
Nenad Kutlačić – Pandurii Târgu Jiu – 2006–2007
Ajdin Maksumić – Pandurii Târgu Jiu – 2010–2011
Darko Maletić – FC Vaslui – 2005–2006
Bojan Marković – CSMS Iași – 2014–2015
Dejan Martinović – FC Brașov – 2010–2011
Slaviša Mitrović – Național București – 1999–2005
Stevo Nikolić – Oțelul Galați – 2008–2009
Zoran Novaković – Steaua București – 1999–2000
Aleksandar Obrenović – Bihor Oradea – 2003–2004
Denis Omerbegović – Ceahlăul Piatra Neamț – 2011–2012
Denis Pozder – FC Vaslui – 2013–2014
Igor Radovanović – Pandurii Târgu Jiu, Ceahlăul Piatra Neamț – 2006–2007, 2011–2012
Ivan Sesar – SC Juventus București, FC Voluntari – 2017–2019
Enes Šipović – Oțelul Galați, Petrolul Ploiești – 2009–2010, 2011–2015
Duško Stajić – Ceahlăul Piatra Neamț – 2006–2007
Saša Stević – Ceahlăul Piatra Neamț – 2009–2010
Nemanja Supić – Politehnica Timișoara – 2009–2010
Mateo Sušić – CFR Cluj – 2014–2015, 2019–2022
Borislav Topić – FCM Târgu Mureș – 2010–2012
Stojan Vranješ – Pandurii Târgu Jiu, CFR Cluj – 2009–2012
Dženan Zajmović – Politehnica Iași – 2020–2021
Goran Zakarić – CS Universitatea Craiova – 2019–2020
Damir Zlomislić – FC Brașov – 2014–2015

Brazil

Adaílton – FC Vaslui – 2010–2012
Luís Alberto – CFR Cluj – 2012–2013
Hugo Alcântara – CFR Cluj – 2008–2011
Mauro Alonso – FC Brașov – 2011–2012
Altamir – Național București – 2006–2007
Leandro Alves – FC Universitatea Craiova – 2002–2003
Amauri – ASA Târgu Mureș – 2014–2015
William de Amorim – Astra Giurgiu, FCSB,  Academica Clinceni – 2010–2018, 2021–2022
Anderson – FC Vaslui – 2011–2012
John Anderson – FC Voluntari – 2020–2021
Elinton Andrade – Rapid București – 2007–2009
Andrey – Steaua București – 2006–2007
José Anilton – Pandurii Târgu Jiu – 2007–2008
Marcos António – Rapid București – 2010–2012
João Felipe Antunes – Oțelul Galați – 2012–2014
Ademar Aparecido – Gloria Buzău – 2008–2009
Thiago Araújo – Viitorul Constanța – 2013–2014
Arthuro – Steaua București – 2008–2009
André Astorga – Universitatea Cluj – 2007–2008
Roberto Ayza – Ceahlăul Piatra Neamț, Gloria Bistrița, CS Mioveni – 2007–2008, 2011–2013
Baiano – Universitatea Cluj – 2007–2008
Júlio Baptista – CFR Cluj – 2018–2019
Rafael Bastos – CFR Cluj – 2010–2013
Henrique Bernardo – Oțelul Galați, ASA Târgu Mureș, Viitorul Constanța – 2013–2015
Gláuber Berti – Rapid București – 2010–2013
Miguel Bianconi – ACS Poli Timișoara – 2017–2018
Fábio Bilica – Universitatea Cluj – 2007–2008
Fernando Boldrin – Concordia Chiajna, Astra Giurgiu, Steaua București – 2014–2017
Éder Bonfim – Politehnica Timișoara, Gloria Buzău, Steaua București – 2008–2011
Túlio Borges – Universitatea Cluj – 2012–2013
Alex Braz – Universitatea Cluj – 2012–2013
Cauê – FC Vaslui – 2012–2014
Carlos Cardoso – Pandurii Târgu Jiu – 2007–2012
Alessandro Celin – Concordia Chiajna – 2016–2017
Celsinho – FCM Târgu Mureș – 2011–2012 
Césinha – Rapid București, Petrolul Ploiești – 2007–2011, 2012–2013
Thiago Constância – Dinamo București – 2008–2009
Élton Constantino da Silva – Pandurii Târgu Jiu – 2013–2015
Erico Constantino da Silva – Universitatea Cluj, Pandurii Târgu Jiu, Astra Giurgiu, UTA Arad – 2012–2019, 2020–
Júlio César Correa – Dinamo București – 2008–2009
Cleyton – Universitatea Cluj – 2012–2013
Orlando da Costa – Concordia Chiajna – 2013–2014
Danilo – Gloria Bistrița – 2008–2009
Jean Deretti – Academica Clinceni – 2019–2020
Didi – CFR Cluj, FCM Târgu Mureş, Oțelul Galați – 2006–2013
Fabrício Dornellas – Astra Giurgiu – 2016–2017
Edimar – CFR Cluj – 2009–2011, 2012–2014
Edmílson – Pandurii Târgu Jiu – 2007–2008
Edvan – Universitatea Cluj – 2007–2008
Élton – Steaua București – 2007–2008
Marcelina Emerson – Viitorul Constanța – 2013–2014
Everton – Gloria Buzău – 2008–2009
Ezequias – FC Brașov, Rapid București – 2008–2012
Vinicius Fabbron – Ceahlăul Piatra Neamț – 2007–2008, 2009–2010, 2011–2012
Fabinho – FC Brașov – 2008–2009
Christian Fiel – CFR Cluj – 2014–2015
Edmar Figueira – Ceahlăul Piatra Neamț – 2011–2012
Elton Figueiredo – Dinamo București – 2013–2015
Denílson Gabionetta – CFR Cluj – 2013–2014
André Galiassi – CFR Cluj, Unirea Alba Iulia, Concordia Chiajna – 2006–2010, 2011–2012
Renan Garcia – CFR Cluj – 2011–2012
Guilherme Garutti – CS Mioveni – 2021–
Diego Gaúcho – FC Brașov, Astra Ploiești – 2010–2012
Willian Gerlem – Farul Constanța, FC Vaslui – 2006–2012
Gerson – Petrolul Ploiești – 2013–2015
Gil Bahia – FC Vaslui – 2013–2014
Gladstone – FC Vaslui – 2009–2012
Alex dos Santos Gonçalves – Concordia Chiajna, Universitatea Cluj, Pandurii Târgu Jiu – 2011–2014
Grillo – Gaz Metan Mediaș – 2008–2009
Gustavinho – Rapid București – 2010–2011
Halisson – FCM Târgu Mureș – 2011–2012
Pedro Henrique – ACS Poli Timișoara – 2015–2017
Dos Santos Itamar – FC Brașov – 2002–2003
Jackson – Pandurii Târgu Jiu – 2007–2008
Jair – Petrolul Ploiești – 2022–
Jessui – Pandurii Târgu Jiu – 2007–2008
Cardoso Júnior – FC Brașov – 2010–2011
Jaime Júnior – CS Otopeni – 2008–2009
Renato Kanu – FC Brașov – 2011–2012
Kleyr – Gloria Buzău – 2007–2008
Rafael Kneif – Ceahlăul Piatra Neamț – 2014–2015
Laio dos Santos – Gloria Bistrița – 2012–2013
Laionel – Astra Ploiești – 2011–2012
Alex Leandro – Unirea Urziceni – 2006–2007
Manoel Lemes – Gloria Buzău – 2008–2009
Lexandro – Gaz Metan Mediaș – 2014–2015
Fábio Lima – Gloria Buzău – 2008–2009
Igor de Lima – FC Vaslui – 2005–2006
Luis Lima – Rapid București – 1999–2000
Lionn – CFR Cluj – 2011–2012
David Lopes – FC Universitatea Craiova – 2010–2011
Gabriel Machado – Universitatea Cluj, Steaua București – 2010–2012, 2013–2014
Madson – FC Vaslui, CS Universitatea Craiova – 2013–2017
Edu Magri – FC Universitatea Craiova – 2004–2005
Maicon – Steaua București − 2010−2011
Marcus Marquinhos – Oțelul Galați, Astra Giurgiu – 2012−2014, 2017–2018
Mario Marquinhos – FC Universitatea Craiova – 2004–2005
Bruno Martins – ASA Târgu Mureș – 2014−2016
Yuri Matias – Gaz Metan Mediaș, CFR Cluj – 2020–
Hélder Maurílio – Rapid București, Dinamo București, Politehnica Timișoara – 2009–2011
Rodrigo Menezes – Universitatea Cluj – 2013–2014
Michel Platini Mesquita – Dinamo București – 2011–2012
Wanderson Miranda – Corona Brașov, Dinamo București – 2013–2015
Bruno Moraes – Gloria Bistrița – 2010–2011
Marquinhos Moraes – Gloria Bistrița – 2012–2013
Júnior Morais – Astra Giurgiu, FCSB, Rapid București − 2010−2019, 2021−
Gabriel de Moura – Sepsi Sfântu Gheorghe, Dinamo București, Gaz Metan Mediaș – 2018–2022
Ricardo Nascimento – Astra Giurgiu – 2011–2012
Nei – CFR Cluj – 2009–2010
Aluisio Neres – Rapid București – 2004–2005
Nivaldo – Rapid București, FCM Bacău, FC Vaslui – 2000–2003, 2005–2006
André Nunes – Gloria Buzău – 2007–2008
Fábio Nunes – Pandurii Târgu Jiu – 2007–2008
Olberdam – Rapid Bucureşti, Concordia Chiajna – 2010–2011, 2014–2015
Eric de Oliveira – Gaz Metan Mediaș, Pandurii Târgu Jiu, Viitorul Constanța, FC Voluntari – 2008–2011, 2012–2015, 2016–2021
Endrick Parafita – FC Botoșani – 2016–2017
Paulinho – Universitatea Cluj – 2014–2015
Daniel Paulista – Rapid București – 2008–2009
Peterson Peçanha – Rapid București, Petrolul Ploiești, Viitorul Constanța – 2012–2016
Marquinhos Pedroso – Viitorul Constanța – 2020–2021
Rafael Pereira – Gaz Metan Mediaș – 2008–2009
Stefan Pereira – Rapid București – 2012–2013
Johnes Elias Pinto – Unirea Alba Iulia – 2009–2010
Romário Pires – Gloria Bistrița, Petrolul Ploiești, Astra Giurgiu, FC Hermannstadt, Farul Constanța, Universitatea Cluj – 2012–2014, 2018–
Cláudio Pitbull – Rapid București – 2008–2009
João Marcos Quintanilha – Corona Brașov – 2013–2014
Anselmo Ramon – CFR Cluj – 2010–2011
Fabiano Ramos – Apulum Alba Iulia – 2003–2004
Thiago Ramos – UTA Arad – 2006–2007
Davi Rancan – Oțelul Galați – 2005–2007
Reinaldo  – Universitatea Cluj – 2010–2011
Rivaldinho – Dinamo București, Viitorul Constanța – 2016–2020
Tiago Roberto – Gloria Buzău – 2008–2009
Adi Rocha – Concordia Chiajna, Steaua București – 2011–2013
Rafael Rocha – Politehnica Timișoara, Concordia Chiajna – 2010–2011, 2012–2013
Roger – UTA Arad, CFR Cluj – 2020–
Rogério – Rapid București – 2004–2005
Ronny – CFR Cluj – 2011–2013
Rudison – Ceahlăul Piatra Neamț – 2009–2010
Mateus Santos – FC Botoșani – 2021–
Jô Santos – Politehnica Iași, FC Hermannstadt,  Viitorul Constanța  – 2017–2018, 2019–2021
Jája Silva – FC Botoșani – 2021–2022
Raul Silva – CS Universitatea Craiova – 2022–
Renan Silva – Rapid București, Petrolul Ploiești – 2011–2013 
Ayres Simão – Gloria Bistrița – 2007–2008
Guilherme Sityá – Concordia Chiajna, Petrolul Ploiești, Steaua București – 2011–2016
William Soares – CFR Cluj – 2020–2021
Júlio César Souza – Rapid București – 2008–2009
Juliano Spadacio – Rapid București, Astra Ploiești – 2008–2012
Marcos Tamandaré – Rapid București – 2007–2008
Leandro Tatu – Steaua București – 2011–2014
Rodrigo Teixeira – Ceahlăul Piatra Neamț – 2000–2001
Ruan Teles – Argeș Pitești – 2020–2022
André Todescato – Politehnica Iași – 2008–2009
Thiago Tremonti – Pandurii Târgu Jiu – 2008–2010
Gustavo Vagenin – CS Universitatea Craiova – 2016–2018, 2019–2020, 2021– 
Cássio Vargas – Rapid București – 2010–2012
Léo Veloso – CFR Cluj – 2009–2011
André Vieira – Oțelul Galați – 2002–2003
Ricardo Vilana – Unirea Urziceni, Steaua București – 2006–2011
Paulo Vinícius – CFR Cluj, FCSB – 2017–2022
Vitinho – Gaz Metan Mediaș – 2011–2015
Francisco Wagsley – Ceahlăul Piatra Neamț – 2014–2015
Walace – Rapid București, SC Juventus București, FC Voluntari, Dunărea Călărași – 2012–2013, 2017–2019
Wandeir – Pandurii Târgu Jiu – 2008–2009
Weldon – CFR Cluj – 2011–2013
Wellington – Concordia Chiajna, Pandurii Târgu Jiu – 2013–2016
Wellyson – Ceahlăul Piatra Neamț – 2014–2015
Wendel – FC Universitatea Craiova – 2010–2011
Wesley – FC Vaslui, CSMS Iași – 2009–2013, 2014–2015
José Williams – FC Brașov – 2010–2011
Willie – FC Botoșani – 2016–2017
Ygor – Gloria Bistrița – 2010–2011

Bulgaria

Stanislav Angelov – Steaua București – 2010–2011
Krum Bibishkov – Steaua București – 2009–2010
Atanas Bornosuzov – Astra Ploiești – 2010–2011
Asen Chandarov – Academica Clinceni – 2020–2022
Bozhidar Chorbadzhiyski – FCSB – 2019–2020
Tsvetelin Chunchukov – Academica Clinceni, Sepsi Sfântu Gheorghe, Chindia Târgoviște – 2020–2022
Kristian Dimitrov – CFR Cluj – 2021–2022
Radoslav Dimitrov – FC Botoșani, CS Universitatea Craiova, Sepsi Sfântu Gheorghe – 2015–
Aleksandar Dyulgerov – Concordia Chiajna – 2014–2015
Venelin Filipov – FC Voluntari – 2015–2018
Boris Galchev – Dinamo București – 2012–2013
Emil Gargorov – FC Universitatea Craiova – 2010–2011
Stanislav Genchev – FC Vaslui – 2008–2011
Viktor Genev – Petrolul Ploiești – 2015–2016
Vladimir Gogov – Academica Clinceni – 2021–2022
Yordan Gospodinov – Concordia Chiajna – 2011–2012
Plamen Iliev – FC Botoșani, Astra Giurgiu, Dinamo București, FC Hermannstadt – 2015–2019, 2021–
Valentin Iliev – FC Universitatea Craiova, Steaua București, CS Universitatea Craiova – 2009–2012, 2015–2016
Antoni Ivanov – Gaz Metan Mediaș, CS Universitatea Craiova, FC Voluntari, Dinamo București – 2018–2022
Mario Kirev – ACS Poli Timișoara – 2013–2014
Rosen Kirilov – FC Vaslui – 2008–2009
Georgi Kitanov – Astra Giurgiu – 2019–2020
Stoyan Kolev – Oțelul Galați – 2007–2010
Plamen Krumov – Concordia Chiajna, Universitatea Cluj – 2011–2013
Milen Lahchev – Concordia Chiajna – 2011–2012
Miroslav Manolov – ASA Târgu Mureș – 2014–2016
Zhivko Milanov – FC Vaslui – 2009–2013
Bozhidar Mitrev – FC Voluntari – 2018–2020
Georgi Pashov – Academica Clinceni, Petrolul Ploiești – 2020–
Ilko Pirgov – CS Otopeni – 2008–2009
Apostol Popov – CS Universitatea Craiova – 2015–2018
Milen Radukanov – Naţional București – 1999–2000
Martin Raynov –  Argeș Pitești – 2021–
Georgi Sarmov – ACS Poli Timișoara – 2015–2016
Radostin Stanev – Național București – 2004–2007
Orlin Starokin – Dinamo București – 2015–2016
Martin Toshev – Academica Clinceni – 2020–2021
Aleksandar Tsvetkov – Academica Clinceni – 2021–2022
Chigozie Udoji – Astra Ploiești, FC Brașov – 2011–2012
Stefan Velev – Sepsi Sfântu Gheorghe – 2018–2020
Pavel Vidanov – Rapid București – 2010–2011
Zhivko Zhelev – Oțelul Galați, Steaua București – 2007–2010
Hristo Zlatinski – CS Universitatea Craiova, Steaua București – 2015–2019

Burkina Faso
Narcisse Bambara – Concordia Chiajna, Universitatea Cluj – 2012–2015
Djakaridja Koné – Dinamo București – 2009–2012
Yssouf Koné – CFR Cluj – 2008–2011
Paul Koulibaly – Dinamo București – 2012–2013
Salif Nogo – Oțelul Galați, Politehnica Iaşi, Astra Ploieşti – 2005–2012
Bakary Saré – CFR Cluj – 2010–2013
Blaise Yaméogo – Chindia Târgoviște – 2019–2021
Mamadou Zongo – Universitatea Cluj – 2007–2008

Burundi
Mohamed Tchité – Petrolul Ploiești – 2014–2015

Cameroon

Anatole Abang – Astra Giurgiu – 2017–2018
Éric Aleokol – FC Universitatea Craiova – 2003–2004
Mindourna Andela – Petrolul Ploiești – 1994–1995
Steve Leo Beleck – CFR Cluj – 2015–2016
Patrick Bengondo – FC Universitatea Craiova – 2003–2004
Vincent Bikana – Petrolul Ploiești – 2011–2012
Pierre Boya – Rapid București – 2007–2009
Franck Cédric – FC Voluntari – 2015–2016
Dani Chigou – Farul Constanța – 2007–2008
Joyskim Dawa – FC Botoșani, FCSB – 2021–
Pierre Ebéde – Astra Ploiești – 2010–2011
Patrick Ekeng – Dinamo București – 2015–2016
Lewis Enoh – Politehnica Iași – 2018–2019
Marcel Essombé – Dinamo București – 2015–2016
Collins Fai – Dinamo București – 2013–2016
Nana Falemi – Petrolul Ploiești, Steaua București, FC Vaslui, Gaz Metan Mediaş – 1997–2006, 2008–2009
Patrice Feussi – ASA Târgu Mureș, Dinamo București, Concordia Chiajna – 2014–2018
Paul Garita –  Argeș Pitești – 2022–
Antonio Ghomsi – Dinamo București – 2015–2016
Abdel Lamanje – Astra Giurgiu – 2020–2021
Justin Mengolo – Universitatea Cluj, Astra Giurgiu – 2014–2015, 2018–2019
Jérémie N'Jock – UTA Arad, FC Universitatea Craiova – 2002–2005, 2006–2007, 2008–2009
Jean Christian N'Kongue – Oțelul Galați – 2009–2010
Michael Ngadeu-Ngadjui – FC Botoșani – 2014–2016
Bertrand Ngapounou – Oțelul Galați – 2007–2008
Christian Pouga – FC Vaslui – 2010–2011
Njongo Priso – Petrolul Ploiești – 2013–2015
Edgar Salli –Sepsi Sfântu Gheorghe – 2019–2020
Kallé Soné – Unirea Urziceni, CS Otopeni – 2006–2007, 2008–2009
Robert Tambe – CFR Cluj – 2018–2019
Jean Paul Yontcha – CS Otopeni – 2008–2009
Jacques Zoua – Astra Giurgiu, Viitorul Constanța – 2018–2020

Canada
Milan Borjan – FC Vaslui – 2011–2012
Lars Hirschfeld – CFR Cluj – 2008–2009
Easton Ongaro – UTA Arad – 2021–2022
Tosaint Ricketts – Politehnica Timișoara – 2010–2011

Cape Verde

Tiago Almeida – Politehnica Iași, FC Hermannstadt – 2017–2018, 2019–2020
Brito – Dinamo București – 2019–2020
Rodny Cabral – Politehnica Iași – 2019–2021
Emerson da Luz – Gloria Bistrița – 2008–2009
Hugo Évora – Ceahlăul Piatra Neamţ – 2007–2008
Ely Fernandes – Gaz Metan Mediaș, Viitorul Constanța, Farul Constanța, Universitatea Cluj – 2017–
José Emílio Furtado – ACS Poli Timișoara – 2013–2014
Kay – CS Universitatea Craiova – 2014–2017
Mailson Lima – Viitorul Constanța – 2017–2019
Félix Mathaus – Gaz Metan Mediaș, Petrolul Ploiești – 2021–
Pedro Moreira – Gloria Buzău – 2008–2009
Néné – FC Brașov – 2009–2010
Nivaldo – Concordia Chiajna – 2017–2019
Platini – Politehnica Iași – 2017–2021
Rambé – CS Universitatea Craiova – 2016–2017
Dany Mendes Ribeiro – Gloria Bistrița – 2008–2009
Nuno Rocha – CS Universitatea Craiova – 2014–2017, 2018–2019
Willy Semedo – Politehnica Iași – 2018–2019
Marco Soares – Pandurii Târgu Jiu – 2007–2008
Sténio – Politehnica Iași – 2016–2017
Hélder Tavares – Oțelul Galați, FC Voluntari – 2014–2015, 2020–
Fernando Varela – FC Vaslui, Steaua București – 2012–2016
Zé Rui – Gloria Bistrița – 2009–2010

Central African Republic
Manassé Enza-Yamissi – Petrolul Ploiești, Concordia Chiajna – 2012–2014, 2017–2018
Habib Habibou – Steaua București, Politehnica Iași – 2007–2008, 2019–2020
Fernander Kassaï – Gaz Metan Mediaș – 2020–2021

Chad
Sanaa Altama – Oțelul Galați, Petrolul Ploiești – 2014–2016

Chile
Nicolás Canales – CFR Cluj – 2007–2008
Daúd Gazale – Oțelul Galați – 2012–2013
Sebastián Páez – FC Brașov – 2011–2012
Diego Rubio – Pandurii Târgu Jiu – 2013–2014
Juan Toloza – FC Brașov – 2010–2012

Colombia

Óscar Arce – Corona Brașov – 2013–2014
Mauricio Cuero – FC Vaslui – 2013–2014
Cristian Mejía – Politehnica Timișoara – 2009–2010
Dayro Moreno – Steaua București – 2007–2010
Pepe Moreno – Steaua București – 2007–2008, 2009–2010
Juan Toja – Steaua București – 2008–2010
Brayan Torres – FC Botoșani – 2021–2022
John Valencia – Oțelul Galați – 2005–2006
Róbinson Zapata – Steaua București – 2007–2010

Comoros
Nasser Chamed – Gaz Metan Mediaș, Chindia Târgoviște – 2017–

Congo
Dylan Bahamboula – Astra Giurgiu – 2018–2019
Armel Disney – Pandurii Târgu Jiu, Farul Constanța – 2005–2007
Férébory Doré – Petrolul Ploiești, CFR Cluj – 2013–2015
Hugo Konongo – Sepsi Sfântu Gheorghe – 2019–2020
Yves Pambou – Gaz Metan Mediaș – 2020–2021
Yannick Salem – Concordia Chiajna – 2011–2012
Juvhel Tsoumou – FC Hermannstadt, FCSB, Viitorul Constanța – 2018–2021

Congo DR

Jeremy Bokila – Petrolul Ploiești, CFR Cluj, Dinamo București – 2012–2013, 2017–2018
Mike Cestor – Astra Giurgiu, CFR Cluj, Argeș Pitești – 2018–
Rodrigue Dikaba – Ceahlăul Piatra Neamț – 2009–2010
Hervé Kage – FC Botoșani – 2021–2022
Patrick Kanyuka – Unirea Alba Iulia – 2009–2010
Yves Ma-Kalambay – Oțelul Galați – 2014–2015
Parfait Mandanda – Dinamo București – 2018–2019
Junior Mapuku – Dunărea Călărași – 2018–2019
Ewango Metre – FC Universitatea Craiova – 2002–2003
Wilfred Moke – FC Voluntari, Steaua București – 2015–2017
Filston Mongu-Nkoy – FC Universitatea Craiova – 2004–2005
Camille Muzinga – Rapid București – 2002–2003
Aristote N'Dongala – Academica Clinceni – 2019–2020
Patrick N'Koyi – Petrolul Ploiești – 2014–2015
Jordan Nkololo – FC Hermannstadt – 2018–2019
Marlin Piana – Oțelul Galați – 2003–2004

Costa Rica
Dylan Flores – Politehnica Iași, Sepsi Sfântu Gheorghe – 2018–2021
Winston Parks – Politehnica Timișoara – 2008–2010
Deyver Vega – Politehnica Iași – 2020–2021

Croatia

Adnan Aganović – FC Brașov, Viitorul Constanța, Steaua București, Sepsi Sfântu Gheorghe – 2013–2017, 2020–
Muhamed Alghoul – Academica Clinceni – 2021–2022
Ante Aralica – FC Hermannstadt – 2020–2021
Antonio Asanović – CS Turnu Severin, Dinamo București, Corona Brașov – 2012–2014
Stjepan Babić – Concordia Chiajna – 2017–2018
Dražen Bagarić – FC Hermannstadt – 2020–2021
Matej Bagarić – Concordia Chiajna – 2014–2015
Hrvoje Barišić – Sepsi Sfântu Gheorghe – 2019–2020
Marko Bencun – FC Brașov – 2014–2015
Saša Bjelanović – CFR Cluj – 2010–2011, 2012–2013
Josip Bonacin – Unirea Alba Iulia – 2009–2010
Marko Brekalo – FC Botoșani – 2018–2019
Mario Brlečić – Concordia Chiajna – 2014–2015
Karlo Bručić – CFR Cluj – 2022–
Vinko Buden – Ceahlăul Piatra Neamț – 2014–2015
Dario Čanađija – Astra Giurgiu – 2020–2021
Ferante Colnago – Rapid București – 1932–1938
Ljuban Crepulja – Astra Giurgiu, Rapid București – 2019–
Ivan Ćurjurić – ACS Poli Timișoara – 2017–2018
Lovro Cvek – CFR Cluj – 2021–
Filip Dangubić – Chindia Târgoviște, UTA Arad – 2019–2020, 2021–2022
Niko Datković – CS Universitatea Craiova – 2017–2018
Gabriel Debeljuh – FC Hermannstadt, CFR Cluj – 2019–
Damjan Đoković – CFR Cluj  – 2013–2014, 2017–2021
Marko Dugandžić – FC Botoșani, CFR Cluj – 2019–
Josip Fuček – ACS Poli Timișoara – 2016–2017
Dominik Glavina – CS Universitatea Craiova – 2017–2019
Tomislav Gomelt – CFR Cluj, Dinamo București – 2015–2017, 2018–2019
Toni Gorupec – Astra Giurgiu – 2014–2015
Kristijan Ipša – Petrolul Ploiești – 2014–2015
Josip Ivančić – Chindia Târgoviște – 2019–2020
Antonio Jakoliš – CFR Cluj, FCSB, Argeș Pitești – 2014–2017, 2018–2019, 2022–
Filip Jazvić – CFR Cluj, ASA Târgu Mureș, CS Universitatea Craiova, FC Hermannstadt – 2014–2017, 2018–2019
Igor Jovanović – Sepsi Sfântu Gheorghe, Astra Giurgiu, Dinamo București – 2018–2019, 2020–2022
Tomislav Jurić – FC Brașov – 2014–2015
Ivan Kelava – Politehnica Iași – 2017–2018
Renato Kelić – CS Universitatea Craiova – 2016–2020
Mihovil Klapan – UTA Arad – 2020–2021
Denis Kolinger – CFR Cluj – 2022–
Dominik Kovačić – FC U Craiova – 2021–2022
Mislav Leko – FC Brașov – 2013–2015
Ivan Lendrić – FC Hermannstadt – 2018–2019
Karlo Letica – CFR Cluj – 2021–2022
Goran Ljubojević – FCM Târgu Mureș – 2011–2012
Filip Lončarić – Gaz Metan Mediaș – 2012–2013
Mate Maleš – CFR Cluj – 2018–2019
Ivan Mamut – CS Universitatea Craiova, FCSB – 2020–
Luka Marić – Dinamo București, Argeș Pitești – 2016–2018, 2020–2021
Vinko Međimorec – UTA Arad – 2021–2022
Filip Mrzljak – Pandurii Târgu Jiu, Astra Giurgiu, Dinamo București – 2014–2020
Karlo Muhar – CFR Cluj – 2022–
Leopold Novak – FC Brașov, ACS Poli Timișoara – 2014–2015, 2016–2017
Saša Novaković – FC Brașov, FC Voluntari – 2014–2016
Jure Obšivač – Sepsi Sfântu Gheorghe – 2017–2018
Antun Palić – Dinamo București, Argeș Pitești  – 2015–2018, 2020–2022
Ivan Pešić – Dinamo București, FC Voluntari  – 2017–2019, 2020–2021
Stipe Plazibat – Academica Clinceni – 2021–2022
Stjepan Plazonja – FC Hermannstadt – 2019–2020
Mateo Poljak – Astra Giurgiu – 2017–2018
Igor Prahić – FC Vaslui – 2013–2014
Ante Puljić – Dinamo București – 2015–2016, 2019–2021
Ante Roguljić – CS Universitatea Craiova – 2021–
Dario Rugašević – Gaz Metan Mediaș – 2016–2017
Ante Sarić – Politehnica Iași – 2015–2017
Dino Škvorc – Universitatea Cluj – 2014–2015
Matija Smrekar – Pandurii Târgu Jiu – 2014–2015
Josip Šoljić – ACS Poli Timișoara – 2016–2018
Tomislav Šorša – CFR Cluj – 2016–2017
Hrvoje Spahija – FC Voluntari, CS Universitatea Craiova – 2015–2018
Dino Špehar – Concordia Chiajna – 2017–2018
Oliver Tole – CS Turnu Severin – 2012–2013
Frane Vitaić – Oțelul Galați – 2008–2009
Aljoša Vojnović – Dinamo București – 2015–2016
Ante Vukušić – FCSB – 2020–2021
Mario Vrdoljak – Academica Clinceni – 2021–2022
Filip Žderić – Gaz Metan Mediaș – 2017–2018
Josip Zeba – Concordia Chiajna – 2017–2018
Ivan Zgrablić – FC Voluntari – 2018–2019
Ivica Žunić – CFR Cluj – 2020–2021

Curaçao
Jafar Arias – Argeș Pitești – 2021–2022
Quenten Martinus – FC Botoșani – 2014–2016
Rihairo Meulens – Rapid București – 2014–2015
Gevaro Nepomuceno – Petrolul Ploiești, Dinamo București – 2014–2016, 2020–2021
Everon Pisas – ACS Poli Timișoara – 2015–2016
Prince Rajcomar – ACS Poli Timișoara – 2015–2016

Cyprus
Elias Charalambous – FC Vaslui – 2012–2013
Paraskevas Christou – Universitatea Cluj, Pandurii Târgu Jiu – 2012–2015
Vincent Laban – Astra Giurgiu – 2013–2015
Marcos Michael – Petrolul Ploiești – 2015–2016
Urko Pardo – Rapid București – 2008–2009
Stelios Parpas – Steaua București – 2009–2010
Athos Solomou – Oțelul Galați – 2014–2015

Czech Republic
Ondřej Bačo – Gaz Metan Mediaș – 2020–2021
Miloš Buchta – Gaz Metan Mediaș, Rapid București – 2009–2015
Martin Černoch – Politehnica Iași, Ceahlăul Piatra Neamț – 2005–2008
Pavel Čmovš – Rapid București, Academica Clinceni – 2014–2015, 2021–2022
Lukáš Droppa – Pandurii Târgu Jiu, Gaz Metan Mediaș, FC Voluntari – 2015–2016, 2019–
Marcel Gecov – Rapid București – 2014–2015
Martin Jícha – Ceahlăul Piatra Neamț – 2013–2014
Tomáš Josl – Rapid București – 2014–2015
Karel Kratochvíl – Gaz Metan Mediaș – 2009–2010
Petr Mach – Gaz Metan Mediaș – 2013–2014
Lukáš Magera – Politehnica Timișoara – 2008–2011
Zdeněk Ondrášek – FCSB – 2021–2022
Radek Opršal – Național București, Astra Ploiești – 2006–2007, 2009–2012
Emil Rilke – Universitatea Cluj – 2013–2014
Tomáš Smola – Gaz Metan Mediaș – 2020–2022
Tomáš Wágner – UTA Arad – 2021–2022
Martin Živný – Dinamo București – 2009–2010

Denmark
Vito Hammershøy-Mistrati – CFR Cluj – 2022–
Thomas Juel-Nielsen – Gaz Metan Mediaș – 2019–2020
Youssef Toutouh – FC Botoșani  – 2020–2021
Thomas Villadsen – Ceahlăul Piatra Neamț – 2009–2010, 2011–2012

Djibouti
Ismail Hassan – Petrolul Ploieşti – 2015–2016

Egypt
Tarek Amer – Gloria Buzău – 2008–2009

El Salvador
Nelson Bonilla – Viitorul Constanța – 2014–2015

England
Mark Burke – Rapid București – 2001–2002
Ross Jenkins – ACS Poli Timișoara – 2015–2016
Wilson Kneeshaw – ACS Poli Timișoara – 2013–2014
Jeffrey Monakana – FC Voluntari – 2015–2016
Jordan Mustoe – Dinamo București – 2018–2019
Jordan Robertson – Gaz Metan Mediaș – 2013–2014

Equatorial Guinea
Rodolfo Bodipo – FC Vaslui – 2010–2011
Sipo – Pandurii Târgu Jiu – 2013–2014

Estonia
Ilja Antonov – FC Hermannstadt – 2018–2019
Artjom Artjunin – FC Brașov – 2014–2015
Vitali Gussev – Astra Ploiești – 2009–2010
Mattias Käit – Rapid București – 2021–
Sergei Lepmets – Concordia Chiajna, Ceahlăul Piatra Neamț – 2012–2013
Eino Puri – FC Botoșani – 2013–2014
Eduard Ratnikov – Oțelul Galați – 2007–2008
Joonas Tamm – FCSB – 2022–

Faroe Islands
Kaj Leo í Bartalsstovu – Dinamo București – 2015–2016

Finland
Vahid Hambo – Astra Giurgiu – 2018–2020

France

Baptiste Aloé – Dinamo București – 2021–2022
Florent André – ASA Târgu Mureș – 2016–2017
Yassine Bahassa – FC U Craiova – 2022–
Alexandre Barthe – CS Universitatea Craiova – 2016–2018
Fabrice Begeorgi – Petrolul Ploiești – 2015–2016
Julien Bègue – Astra Giurgiu – 2018–2020
Abdelhak Belahmeur – FC Voluntari – 2018–2020
Yann Boé-Kane – Astra Giurgiu – 2020–2021
Fabien Boudarène – Universitatea Cluj – 2007–2008
Damien Boudjemaa – Petrolul Ploiești, Astra Giurgiu – 2011–2014, 2015–2017
Jean-Bryan Boukaka – Rapid București – 2014–2015
Karim Boutadjine – Pandurii Târgu Jiu, Universitatea Cluj – 2012–2015
Enzo Célestine – Argeș Pitești – 2022–
Thomas Chesneau – Dinamo București – 2021–2022
Sacha Clémence – Dunărea Călărași – 2018–2019
Jérémy Corinus – Academica Clinceni, Farul Constanța – 2021–
Maurice Dalé – Unirea Urziceni – 2010–2011
Sylvain Deslandes –  Argeș Pitești – 2020–2021
Mickaël Diakota – Gaz Metan Mediaș – 2019–2020
Bradley Diallo – Gaz Metan Mediaș, Politehnica Iași, Chindia Târgoviște, FC U Craiova – 2018–2020, 2021–2022
Claude Dielna – Dinamo București, CS Universitatea Craiova – 2016–2017, 2019–2020
Alexandre Durimel – CS Turnu Severin, Dinamo București – 2012–2015
Malcom Edjouma – Viitorul Constanța, FC Botoșani, FCSB – 2019–2020, 2021–
Michel Espinosa – Dinamo București – 2021–2022
Jean-Alain Fanchone – Petrolul Ploiești – 2014–2015
Nicolas Farina – Petrolul Ploiești – 2015–2016
Jérémy Faug-Porret – FC Botoșani, Petrolul Ploiești – 2014–2016
Fabrice Fernandes – Dinamo București – 2006–2008
Harlem Gnohéré – Dinamo București, FCSB – 2015–2020
Nicolas Godemèche – CFR Cluj – 2011–2013
Steven Goma – Academica Clinceni – 2021–2022
Hérold Goulon – Viitorul Constanța – 2015–2016
Elliot Grandin – Astra Giurgiu – 2014–2015
Ludovic Guerriero – Petrolul Ploiești – 2015–2016
Kevin Hatchi – Astra Ploiești – 2009–2010
Lyes Houri – Viitorul Constanța, CS Universitatea Craiova – 2018–2020, 2021–2022
Jules Iloki – Concordia Chiajna – 2018–2019
Romain Inez – Petrolul Ploiești – 2015–2016
Bruce Inkango – Oțelul Galați – 2012–2013
Bernard Itoua – Gaz Metan Mediaș – 2016–2017
Ismaël Kanda – Gaz Metan Mediaș – 2021–2022
Lossémy Karaboué – FC Botoșani – 2018–2019
Hamidou Keyta – Dunărea Călărași, Viitorul Constanța, FC Botoșani – 2018–2021
Anthony Le Tallec – Astra Giurgiu – 2017–2018
Robert Maah – CFR Cluj – 2012–2014
Younes Marzouk – Rapid București – 2021–
Nasser Menassel – CS Otopeni, Internațional Curtea de Argeș, Pandurii Târgu Jiu, Universitatea Cluj, FC Brașov – 2008–2013
Jean-Philippe Mendy – Dinamo București – 2006–2007, 2008–2009
Xavier Méride – Dinamo București – 2003–2004
Teddy Mézague – Dinamo București – 2018–2019
Martin Mimoun – Politehnica Iași – 2018–2019
Thibault Moulin – Academica Clinceni – 2020–2022
Daudet N'Dongala – Politehnica Iași – 2018–2019
Tony Njiké –  Argeș Pitești – 2022–
Bryan Nouvier – CFR Cluj, Sepsi Sfântu Gheorghe – 2015–2019, 2020–2021
Philippe Nsiah – Academica Clinceni – 2019–2020
Roy Odiaka – Universitatea Cluj – 2013–2014
Abdelhakim Omrani – Dunărea Călărași – 2018–2019
Hervin Ongenda – FC Botoșani – 2018–2020
Romuald Peiser – Rapid București – 2003–2004
Steven Pelé – Universitatea Cluj – 2010–2012
Michaël Pereira – CFR Cluj – 2019–2021
Balthazar Pierret – Dinamo București – 2021–2022
Grégoire Puel – FC Voluntari – 2020–2021
Réda Rabeï – SC Juventus București – 2017–2018
Guillaume Rippert – Petrolul Ploiești – 2015–2016
Jérémy Sapina – Rapid București – 2014–2015
Florent Sauvadet – Petrolul Ploiești, Universitatea Cluj – 2012–2015
Billal Sebaihi – FC Hermannstadt – 2020–2021
Richard Sila – FC Botoșani, Chindia Târgoviște – 2021–2022
Mohamadou Sissoko – Oțelul Galați – 2014–2015
Aymen Souda – Dunărea Călărași – 2018–2019
Grégory Tadé – CFR Cluj, Steaua București – 2013–2016
Aziz Tafer – Gloria Buzău – 2008–2009
Cyril Théréau – Steaua București – 2006–2007
Steven Thicot – Dinamo București – 2013–2014
Joël Thomas – CS Turnu Severin, Dinamo București – 2012–2014
Oumare Tounkara – Astra Giurgiu – 2019–2020
Alassane Touré – Astra Giurgiu – 2014–2015
Stéphane Tritz – Oțelul Galați – 2013–2014
Karim Yoda – Astra Giurgiu – 2013–2014
Abdellah Zoubir – Petrolul Ploiești – 2015–2016

French Guiana
Kévin Rimane – FC Hermannstadt – 2019–2020

Gabon
Georges Ambourouet – Ceahlăul Piatra Neamț – 2009–2010
Gaëtan Missi Mezu – Dunărea Călărași – 2018–2019

Georgia
Giorgi Chanturia – CFR Cluj – 2013–2015
Nika Dzalamidze – SC Juventus București – 2017–2018
Avtandil Ebralidze – FC Voluntari – 2019–2020
Akaki Khubutia – Gaz Metan Mediaș, ACS Poli Timișoara – 2009–2013, 2016–2018

Germany
Marcel Avdić – Oțelul Galați – 2014–2015
Christopher Braun – FC Botoșani, CFR Cluj – 2020–
Timo Gebhart – Steaua București – 2015–2016
Sascha Kirschstein – ACS Poli Timișoara – 2015–2016
Roussel Ngankam – FC Botoșani – 2014–2015
Savio Nsereko – FC Vaslui – 2011–2012
Reagy Ofosu – FC Botoșani, CS Universitatea Craiova  – 2019–2022

Ghana

Eduard Abayeteye – Sportul Studenţesc Bucureşti – 1994–1995
Ben Acquah – Argeș Pitești – 1994–1995
Bright Addae – FC Hermannstadt – 2020–2021
Bismark Adjei-Boateng – CFR Cluj – 2021–
William Amamoo – Farul Constanța – 2003–2004
Richard Annang – FC Vaslui – 2010–2012
Baba Alhassan – FC Hermannstadt – 2020–2021, 2022–
Emmanuel Armah – Sportul Studențesc București – 1994–1995
Godfred Bekoé – Gaz Metan Mediaș – 2014–2015
Lawson Bekui – Politehnica Iași – 2018–2019
Owusu Benson – Sportul Studențesc București – 1994–1995
George Blay – Dinamo București, Internațional Curtea de Argeș, Unirea Urziceni – 2006–2011
Sadat Bukari – Astra Giurgiu – 2012–2015
Mohamed Nuru Deen – UM Timșoara – 2001–2002
Isaac Donkor – CS Universitatea Craiova – 2018–2019
Ibrahim Dossey – FC Brașov, Rapid București, Pandurii Târgu Jiu – 2000–2005, 2006–2008
Richard Gadze – FC Voluntari – 2018–2019
Saeed Issah – FC Hermannstadt – 2020–2021, 2022–
Mustafa Jarra – FC Brașov – 2002–2003
Joseph Mensah – Sepsi Sfântu Gheorghe, Politehnica Iași – 2018–2019, 2020–2021
Nelson Mensah – Dinamo București – 1991–1993
Paul Mensah – FC Botoșani – 2021–2022
Hamza Mohammed – Ceahlăul Piatra Neamț – 2007–2008
Sulley Muniru – CFR Cluj, Steaua București – 2012–2017
Emmanuel Osei – Politehnica Timișoara – 2005–2006
Ben Owu – Oțelul Galați – 2001–2002
Kofi Twumasi – Viitorul Constanța – 2017–2018
Bernard White – Rapid București – 1994–1995
Seidu Yahaya – Astra Giurgiu – 2012–2015
Emmanuel Yeboah – CFR Cluj – 2022–

Greece

Nikolaos Baxevanos – FC Botoșani, Politehnica Iași, Chindia Târgoviște – 2019–2022
Alexandros Biris – CS Turnu Severin – 2012–2013
Bruno Chalkiadakis – FC Hermannstadt – 2018–2019
Minas Chalkiadakis – FC Botoșani – 2018–2019
Okan Chatziterzoglou – Academica Clinceni – 2019–2020
Kostas Choumis – Venus București, UTA Arad, Gaz Metan Mediaș – 1936–1941, 1947–1950
Panagiotis Deligiannidis – Sepsi Sfântu Gheorghe – 2020–2021
Sokratis Fytanidis – Gaz Metan Mediaș – 2017–2018
Vasilios Galanis – Gaz Metan Mediaș – 2009–2010
Dan Georgiadis – Juventus București – 1946–1947
Panagiotis Giannopoulos – Argeș Pitești – 2006–2007
Pantelis Kapetanos – Steaua București, CFR Cluj – 2008–2014
Nikos Karamanlis – Jiul Petroșani – 1970–1971
Giorgos Katsikas – Dinamo București – 2017–2019
Nikos Kenourgios – Dinamo București – 2021–2022
Giannis Kontoes – Academica Clinceni – 2019–2020
Giorgos Koutroubis – Concordia Chiajna – 2018–2019
Anestis Nastos – Rapid București – 2021–2022
Giannis Matzourakis – Rapid București – 1969–1970
Christos Metskas – UTA Arad – 1957–1968
Leonidas Panagopoulos – CS Turnu Severin, Săgeata Năvodari, Universitatea Cluj – 2012–2015
Emmanouil Papasterianos – Concordia Chiajna – 2013–2014
Thanasis Papazoglou – Dinamo București, FC Voluntari – 2018–2020
Vasileios Pliatsikas – Astra Giurgiu – 2014–2015
Konstantinos Rougalas – ASA Târgu Mureș – 2016–2017
Dimitris Sialmas – Ceahlăul Piatra Neamț – 2014–2015
Aristidis Soiledis – FC Botoșani, FCSB – 2018–2021
Apostolos Vellios – Academica Clinceni – 2021–2022
Giorgos Zindros – CS Universitatea Craiova – 1974–1976

Guadeloupe
Stéphane Zubar – FC Vaslui – 2008–2010

Guinea
Habib Baldé – Ceahlăul Piatra Neamț, Universitatea Cluj – 2009–2011, 2013–2014
Sekou Camara – FC Botoșani – 2020–
Antoine Conte – CS Universitatea Craiova – 2021–
Salim Cissé – Politehnica Iași – 2017–2018
Boubacar Fofana – Gaz Metan Mediaș,  Sepsi Sfântu Gheorghe  – 2018–2022
Mbemba Sylla – Național București, FC Vaslui – 2003–2006

Guinea-Bissau
Ibraima Baldé – Politehnica Iaşi – 2009–2010
Abel Camará – Petrolul Ploiești – 2013–2014
Aliu Djaló – Gaz Metan Mediaș – 2013–2014
Bruno Fernandes – Ceahlăul Piatra Neamț, Unirea Urziceni, FCM Târgu Mureș – 2007–2011
Francisco Júnior – Gaz Metan Mediaș, Sepsi Sfântu Gheorghe – 2020–
Malá – Farul Constanța, Ceahlăul Piatra Neamț – 2007–2008
Toni Silva – Astra Giurgiu – 2019–2020

Guyana
Terell Ondaan – FC U Craiova – 2021–2022

Haiti
Jean Sony Alcénat – Petrolul Ploiești, Steaua București, FC Voluntari – 2012–2016
Bryan Alceus – Gaz Metan Mediaș, Argeș Pitești – 2020–
Mikaël Cantave – Chindia Târgoviște – 2021–2022
Sony Mustivar – Petrolul Ploiești, FC Hermannstadt – 2011–2015, 2020–2021

Honduras
Édgar Álvarez – Dinamo București – 2012–2013
Carlos Costly – FC Vaslui – 2009–2010

Hungary

István Avar – AMEF Arad, Colțea Brașov, Rapid București – 1921–1922, 1925–1927, 1936–1941
Iuliu Barátky – Stăruința Oradea, CA Oradea, Crișana Oradea, Rapid București, RATA Târgu Mureș – 1927–1930, 1933–1941, 1946–1948
Elemér Berkessy – Jiul Petroșani – 1924–1925
Iuliu Bodola – CA Oradea, Venus București, Ferar Cluj – 1932–1940, 1946–1947
Lukács Bőle – Politehnica Iași – 2014–2017
János Börzsei – Ferar Cluj – 1946–1947
Levente Bősz – Politehnica Iași – 2020–2021
Vilmos Engel – Mureșul Târgu Mureș – 1923–1924
Árpád Fekete – Carmen București – 1946–1947
János Füzér – Ferar Cluj – 1946–1947
János Kovács – CA Oradea, Tricolor Ploiești – 1937–1939, 1940–1941, 1947–1951
Nicolae Kovács – Chinezul Timișoara, Banatul Timișoara, CA Oradea, Ripensia Timișoara, Tricolor Ploiești, Ferar Cluj – 1927–1929, 1932–1939, 1946–1948
Adalbert Marksteiner – Ripensia Timișoara – 1937–1940
Francisc Mészáros – UTA Arad – 1946–1948
Vasile Miriuță – Dinamo București, Gloria Bistrița – 1990–1992
Olivér Nagy – Ceahlăul Piatra Neamț – 2014–2015
Ádám Lang – CFR Cluj – 2018–2019
Gyula Lóránt – UTA Arad – 1946–1947
József Pecsovszky – CAM Timișoara, UTA Arad, CCA București – 1939–1940, 1946–1961
Krisztián Pogacsics – Săgeata Năvodari – 2013–2014
Dániel Prosser – Sepsi Sfântu Gheorghe – 2018–2019
Péter Simek – Politehnica Timișoara – 2006–2007
Vilmos Sipos – Rapid București – 1939–1941
Francisc Spielmann – CA Oradea, UD Reșița – 1934–1938, 1939–1940, 1946–1950
Albert Ströck – Stăruința Oradea – 1921–1922
Zoltán Szaniszló – AMEF Arad, Ferar Cluj – 1934–1940, 1946–1948
Mihai Tänzer – Chinezul Timișoara, Ripensia Timișoara – 1921–1928, 1939–1941
Pál Teleki – Chinezul Timișoara – 1926–1928
Mátyás Tóth – UTA Arad – 1946–1947
Ádám Vass – CFR Cluj – 2012–2013
Adolf Vécsey – CA Oradea – 1946–1952

Iceland
Rúnar Sigurjónsson – CFR Cluj – 2020–2022

Iraq
Ghassan Raouf Heamed – Sportul Studențesc București – 1994–1995
Salih Jaber – FC Universitatea Craiova, Gloria Buzău – 2006–2009
Ali Wahaib – Oțelul Galați – 1997–1998

Ireland
Conor Henderson – Dunărea Călărași – 2018–2019
Sean McDermott – Dinamo București – 2018–2019

Israel
Gai Assulin – Politehnica Iași – 2019–2021
Shlomi Azulay – Astra Giurgiu – 2020–2021
Idan Baruch – Concordia Chiajna – 2011–2012
Hatem Abd Elhamed – Dinamo București – 2014–2015
Idan Golan – FC Voluntari – 2021–2022
Shai Haddad – Petrolul Ploiești – 2014–2015
Yuval Jakobovich – ASA Târgu Mureș – 2016–2017
Omri Kende – Astra Giurgiu – 2012–2013
Kobi Nachtailer – FC Vaslui – 2006–2007
Alon Netzer – ASA Târgu Mureș, Academica Clinceni – 2016–2017, 2019–2020
Klemi Saban – Steaua București – 2006–2007
Elad Shahaf – FC Botoșani – 2022–
Ram Strauss – ACS Poli Timișoara – 2015–2016
Toto Tamuz – Petrolul Ploiești – 2013–2016
David Tiram – Astra Giurgiu – 2019–2020

Italy

Remo Amadio – CFR Cluj – 2014–2015
Nicola Ascoli – Universitatea Cluj – 2010–2011
Stefano Avogadri – Petrolul Ploieşti – 2012–2013 
Davide Bottone – CFR Cluj – 2009–2010
Fabio Bravo – Gaz Metan Mediaș – 2012–2014
Alessandro Caparco – FCM Târgu Mureș, Politehnica Iași, Concordia Chiajna – 2011–2012, 2014–2019
Simone Cavalli – Gloria Bistrița, FCM Târgu Mureș – 2010–2012
Luca Ceccarelli – Dinamo București – 2016–2017
Christian Chirieletti – Ceahlăul Piatra Neamț – 2014–2015
Andrea Compagno – FC U Craiova – 2021–
Riccardo Corallo – Gloria Bistrița – 2010–2011
Antonino D'Agostino – Gloria Bistrița – 2010–2011
Giuseppe De Luca – CFR Cluj – 2018–2019
Roberto De Zerbi – CFR Cluj – 2009–2012
Mario Donadoni – FCM Târgu Mureș – 2010–2011
Nicolao Dumitru – Gaz Metan Mediaș, UTA Arad – 2019–2022
Diego Fabbrini – FC Botoșani, Dinamo București – 2018–2021
Cosimo Figliomeni – Gaz Metan Mediaș – 2014–2015
Matteo Gritti – Petrolul Ploiești – 2011–2012
Luigi Lavecchia – FCM Târgu Mureș – 2010–2011
Davide Massaro – CS Mioveni, Academica Clinceni – 2021–2022
Bryan Mendoza – FC Botoșani – 2019–2020
Mattia Montini – Dinamo București, Astra Giurgiu  – 2018–2021
Michele Paolucci – Petrolul Ploiești – 2015–2016
Lorenzo Paramatti – FC U Craiova – 2021–
Mattia Persano – FC Hermannstadt – 2019–2020
Davide Petrucci – CFR Cluj – 2014–2017
Gianmarco Piccioni – Politehnica Iași – 2015–2017
Felice Piccolo – CFR Cluj – 2009–2014
Mirko Pigliacelli – CS Universitatea Craiova – 2018–2023
Federico Piovaccari – Steaua București – 2013–2014
Riccardo Piscitelli – Dinamo București – 2019–2020
Giuseppe Prestia – Oțelul Galați, Petrolul Ploiești – 2013–2014, 2015–2016
Roberto Romeo – Gaz Metan Mediaș, Universitatea Cluj – 2013–2015, 2016–
Fausto Rossi – CS Universitatea Craiova – 2017–2018
Adriano Russo – FC Voluntari – 2018–2019
Said Ahmed Said – Argeș Pitești – 2021–2022
Simone Scuffet – CFR Cluj – 2022–
Ferdinando Sforzini – CFR Cluj – 2010–2011
Mario Titone – Ceahlăul Piatra Neamț – 2012–2013
Gabriele Zerbo – Concordia Chiajna – 2015–2016

Ivory Coast

Stephane Acka – CS Universitatea Craiova – 2014–2017, 2018–2021
Anoh Attoukora – Dinamo București – 2008–2009
Mamadou Bagayoko – FC U Craiova – 2021–2022
Kévin Boli – Viitorul Constanța, CFR Cluj, FC Botoșani – 2015–2021
Mariko Daouda – FC Universitatea Craiova, Dinamo București, Argeș Pitești, CS Mioveni – 2002–2008
Zié Diabaté – Dinamo București – 2007–2012
Lamine Diarrassouba – Politehnica Iași, FC Brașov – 2008–2011
Leoh Digbeu – Concordia Chiajna – 2014–2015
Constant Djakpa – Pandurii Târgu Jiu – 2007–2008
Kevin Doukouré – Farul Constanța – 2022–
Ghislain Guessan – Concordia Chiajna – 2018–2019
Barry Kader – CS Turnu Severin – 2012–2013
Youssouf Kamara – Argeș Pitești, Pandurii Târgu Jiu – 2008–2010
Wilfried Kanon – Gloria Bistrița, Corona Brașov – 2012–2014
Emmanuel Koné – CFR Cluj, Internațional Curtea de Argeș – 2008–2012
Hamed Koné – FC Voluntari – 2015–2016
Kouassi Kouadja – Astra Giurgiu – 2014–2015
Ulrich Meleke – FC Botoșani, FC Voluntari – 2020–
Muhamed Olawale – FC Voluntari, Chindia Târgoviște – 2021–
Senin Sebai – Astra Giurgiu – 2014–2015
Lacina Traoré – CFR Cluj – 2008–2011, 2019–2020
Ousmane Viera – CFR Cluj, Internațional Curtea de Argeș, Pandurii Târgu Jiu, Sepsi Sfântu Gheorghe, FC Hermannstadt – 2008–2013, 2017–2021
Yedi Zahiri – Gloria Bistrița – 2012–2013
Kévin Zougoula – Dinamo București – 2013–2014
Marco Zoro – FC Universitatea Craiova – 2010–2011

Jamaica
Jason Wright – CS Mioveni – 2021–2022

Japan
Yôki Kumada – Gaz Metan Mediaș – 2013–2014
Sota Mino – FC Hermannstadt – 2022–
Takayuki Seto – Astra Giurgiu, Petrolul Ploiești – 2009–2018, 2019–2021, 2022–

Jordan
Tha'er Bawab – Gloria Bistrița, Gaz Metan Mediaș, CS Universitatea Craiova, Steaua București, Dinamo București, Concordia Chiajna – 2010–2019

Kenya
Jamal Mohammed – FCM Târgu Mureș – 2011–2012
Aboud Omar – Sepsi Sfântu Gheorghe – 2018–2019
Patrick Osiako – Petrolul Ploiești – 2011–2012

Kosovo
Jetmir Krasniqi – FC Voluntari – 2018–2019
Florian Loshaj – Politehnica Iași – 2019–2020

Latvia
Edgars Gauračs – Rapid București – 2009–2010
Deniss Ivanovs – FC Botoșani – 2013–2014
Vitālijs Jagodinskis – Politehnica Iași – 2017–2018
Ņikita Koļesovs – FC Botoșani – 2019–2020
Deniss Romanovs – Dinamo București – 2006–2008
Valērijs Šabala – Viitorul Constanța – 2020–2021
Māris Smirnovs – Dinamo București – 2006–2007

Lebanon
Fayez Chamsine – Pandurii Târgu Jiu – 2013–2015

Liberia
Nyema Gerhardt – CS Otopeni – 2008–2009
Dulee Johnson – Săgeata Năvodari, CSMS Iași – 2013–2015
Alex Nimely – ACS Poli Timișoara, Viitorul Constanța – 2015–2017
Moussa Sanoh – Politehnica Iași, Gaz Metan Mediaș, FC Voluntari, CS Mioveni – 2018–
Ben Teekloh – Farul Constanța, Astra Ploiești – 2006–2009, 2010–2011
Terrence Tisdell – FC Botoșani – 2021–

Lithuania

Giedrius Arlauskis – Unirea Urziceni, Steaua București, CFR Cluj – 2007–2011, 2014–2015, 2017–2022
Rolandas Baravykas – UTA Arad, Universitatea Cluj – 2021–
Vytautas Černiauskas – FC Vaslui, Dinamo București – 2010–2014, 2015–2017
Paulius Grybauskas – Oțelul Galați – 2006–2009
Donatas Kazlauskas – Academica Clinceni – 2021–2022
Linas Klimavičius – Dinamo București, Politehnica Iași – 2018–2020
Tadas Labukas – Oțelul Galați – 2007–2008
Karolis Laukžemis – UTA Arad – 2021–2022
Deivydas Matulevičius – Pandurii Târgu Jiu, FC Botoșani – 2012–2017
Marius Papšys – Sepsi Sfântu Gheorghe – 2017–2018
Linas Pilibaitis – Sepsi Sfântu Gheorghe – 2017–2018
Tadas Simaitis – Oțelul Galați – 2012–2014
Vaidas Slavickas – Ceahlăul Piatra Neamț – 2013–2015
Povilas Valinčius – Petrolul Ploiești – 2011–2012, 2013–2014
Nerijus Valskis – CS Universitatea Craiova – 2014–2015
Aurimas Vertelis – FC Botoșani – 2013–2014
Armantas Vitkauskas – Concordia Chiajna – 2017–2018
Modestas Vorobjovas – UTA Arad, Chindia Târgoviște – 2020–

Madagascar
Dorian Bertrand – Argeș Pitești – 2022–
Julio Donisa – Argeș Pitești – 2022–

Mali
Bourama Fomba – Politehnica Iași, Chindia Târgoviște – 2019–2021
Mourtala Diakité – Dinamo București – 2008–2009
Moussa Diakité – FC Botoșani – 2018–2019
Mamoutou N'Diaye – Dinamo București – 2018–2019
Hadi Sacko – CFR Cluj – 2021–
Yacouba Sylla – CFR Cluj – 2019–2020
Ibrahima Tandia – Sepsi Sfântu Gheorghe – 2017–2019

Martinique
Damien Dussaut – Dinamo București, Viitorul Constanța, Farul Constanța, Rapid București – 2018–
Geoffrey Malfleury – FC Voluntari – 2018–2019

Mauritania
Aly Abeid – UTA Arad – 2022–
Guessouma Fofana – CFR Cluj – 2021–2022

Mauritius
Kévin Bru – Dinamo București – 2019–2020

Moldova

Valeriu Andronic – Dinamo București – 2000–2001
Igor Armaș – FC Voluntari – 2018–
Andrian Bogdan – Politehnica Timișoara – 2002–2003
Gheorghe Boghiu – Oțelul Galați – 2006–2008
Alexandru Boiciuc – Politehnica Iași, Academica Clinceni, Universitatea Cluj – 2014–2017, 2020–2021
Ianoș Brînză – FC Botoșani, Politehnica Iași − 2017–2019, 2020–2021
Igor Bugaiov – Ceahlăul Piatra Neamț – 2007–2008
Nicolai Calancea – Ceahlăul Piatra Neamț, FC Voluntari, CS Universitatea Craiova, Dunărea Călărași, Academica Clinceni – 2013–2020
Cătălin Carp – CFR Cluj, Steaua București, Viitorul Constanța, Dinamo București – 2014–2017, 2021–2022
Eugeniu Cebotaru – Ceahlăul Piatra Neamț, Academica Clinceni, Petrolul Ploiești – 2006–2008, 2009–2010, 2011–2012, 2019–2021, 2022–
Dumitru Ciumac – Ceahlăul Piatra Neamț – 2003–2004
Sergiu Chirilov – Sportul Studențesc București, Rapid București – 1993–1996, 1999–2000
Oleg Clonin – Ceahlăul Piatra Neamț – 2014–2015
Igor Corjan – Olimpia Satu Mare – 1998–1999
Vitalie Damașcan – Sepsi Sfântu Gheorghe – 2021–
Alexandru Dedov – ASA Târgu Mureș – 2015–2016
Enrichi Finica – Rapid București – 2021–2022
Viorel Frunză – FC Vaslui, CFR Cluj, Ceahlăul Piatra Neamț – 2005–2008
Alexandru Golban – Ceahlăul Piatra Neamț – 2007–2008
Gheorghe Gondiu – CFR Cluj – 2020–2021
Dinu Graur – Astra Giurgiu – 2019–2021
Alexandru Guzun – Rapid București – 1992–1994
Gheorghe Harea – Rapid București – 1993–1994
Alexei Koșelev – Politehnica Iași – 2017–2018
Vladislav Lungu – FC Vaslui – 2005–2006
Valentin Lupașcu – Oțelul Galați – 1996–1997
Nicolae Milinceanu – Rapid București, Petrolul Ploiești – 2014–2016
Ghenadie Ochincă – Gloria Buzău – 2007–2008
Artur Pătraș – Politehnica Timișoara, Gloria Buzău, Oțelul Galați, Unirea Urziceni – 2006–2007, 2008–2011
Dan Pîslă – FC Vaslui – 2005–2006
Virgiliu Postolachi – UTA Arad – 2022–
Vadim Rață – Chindia Târgoviște, FC Voluntari – 2019–
Denis Rusu – Politehnica Iași, CS Universitatea Craiova  – 2017–2020, 2022–
Alexei Scala – FCM Bacău – 1992–1993
Iurie Scala – FCM Bacău – 1992–1993
Dan Spătaru – Astra Giurgiu, Dinamo București, Politehnica Iași – 2014–2015, 2016–2018
Valeriu Tiron – FC Botoșani − 2014–2015
Alexandru Vremea – Politehnica Iași – 2017–2018
Denis Zmeu – FC Vaslui – 2006–2012

Montenegro

Admir Adrović – Pandurii Târgu Jiu – 2013–2014
Saša Balić – ASA Târgu Mureș – 2015–2016
Vladimir Božović – Rapid București – 2007–2013
Radomir Đalović – Rapid București – 2008–2010
Uroš Đuranović – Politehnica Iași – 2020–2021
Nenad Đurović – Petrolul Ploiești – 2011–2012
Vladimir Gluščević – Politehnica Timișoara – 2005–2007
Sergej Grubač – FC Botoșani – 2021–
Milan Jovanović – FC Universitatea Craiova, Unirea Urziceni, Universitatea Cluj – 2004–2005, 2006–2008
Aleksandar Madžar – FC Vaslui – 2006–2007
Nemanja Mijušković – FC Hermannstadt – 2018–2019
Stefan Nikolić – Politehnica Timișoara, Steaua București, Sepsi Sfântu Gheorghe – 2010–2014, 2017–2018
Aleksandar Radović – Gaz Metan Mediaș – 2012–2013
Risto Radunović – Astra Giurgiu, FCSB – 2017– 
Momčilo Raspopović – Astra Giurgiu – 2020–2021
Stevan Reljić – Concordia Chiajna – 2014–2015
Milisav Sećković – UTA Arad – 2002–2003
Nikola Vujadinović – Unirea Alba Iulia – 2009–2010
Marko Vukčević – UTA Arad – 2021–

Morocco
Saifeddine Alami – Rapid București – 2021–2022
Khalid Fouhami – Dinamo București – 1998–2000
Nabil Jaadi – Dinamo București – 2018–2019
Reda Jaadi – Dinamo București – 2018–2019
Said Ketlas – Astra Ploiești – 1999–2000 
Aziz Khalouta – Pandurii Târgu Jiu – 2015–2016
Houssine Kharja – Steaua București – 2015–2016
Ismail Kouha – Oțelul Galați – 2007–2008
Anas Tahiri – CFR Cluj – 2021–2022
Monsef Zerka – Petrolul Ploieşti – 2011–2012
Noureddine Ziyati – Rapid București – 2003–2004

Mozambique
Eduardo Jumisse – FC Vaslui – 2012–2013
Paíto – FC Vaslui – 2011–2012

Netherlands
Anass Achahbar – Sepsi Sfântu Gheorghe – 2019–
Fred Benson – Rapid București – 2014–2015
Rashid Browne – FC Botoșani – 2014–2016
Jordy Buijs – Pandurii Târgu Jiu – 2015–2016
Geoffrey Castillion – Universitatea Cluj – 2014–2015
Frank Wiafe Danquah – FC Brașov – 2012–2014
Donovan Deekman – Concordia Chiajna – 2014–2015
Stuart van Doten – Universitatea Cluj – 2013–2014
Stanley Elbers – FC Hermannstadt – 2020–2021
John Goossens – FC Voluntari – 2015–2016
Ninos Gouriye – Astra Giurgiu – 2015–2016
Danzell Gravenberch – Universitatea Cluj – 2014–2015
Ricky van Haaren – Dinamo București – 2015–2016
Moussa Kalisse – FCM Târgu Mureș – 2011–2012
Jeffrey Ket – Pandurii Târgu Jiu – 2016–2017
Milano Koenders – Concordia Chiajna – 2016–2017
Romario Kortzorg – ASA Târgu Mureș, Dinamo București, Astra Giurgiu, Concordia Chiajna – 2015–2018
Bas Kuipers – Viitorul Constanța – 2018–2020
Vlatko Lazić – Astra Giurgiu – 2016–2017
Kevin Luckassen – Politehnica Iași,  Viitorul Constanța, Sepsi Sfântu Gheorghe – 2019–2022
Bart Meijers – Petrolul Ploiești – 2022–
Bradley de Nooijer – Viitorul Constanța, Farul Constanța – 2017–2022
André Ntambue – Ceahlăul Piatra Neamț – 2013–2014
Oulad Omar – Academica Clinceni – 2019–2020
Luís Pedro – ASA Târgu Mureș – 2015–2016
Shaquill Sno – FC Botoșani – 2022–
Desley Ubbink – UTA Arad – 2021–
Sergio Zijler – Universitatea Cluj – 2014–2015

New Zealand
Benjamin van den Broek – Universitatea Cluj – 2014–2015
Glen Moss – Dinamo București – 2006–2007

Nigeria

Paul Abba – CS Turnu Severin – 2012–2013
Jacob Adebanjo – Sepsi Sfântu Gheorghe – 2019–2020
Olubayo Adefemi – Rapid București – 2008–2009
Abiodun Agunbiade – Național București, Politehnica Timișoara, Internațional Curtea de Argeș – 2004–2010
Goodness Ajayi – Astra Giurgiu – 2019–2020
Binawari Ajuwa – Național București – 2006–2007
Kabiru Akinsola – CSMS Iași – 2014–2015
Joseph Akpala – Dinamo București – 2020–2021
Kevin Amuneke – Politehnica Timișoara – 2008–2009
Rabiu Baita – Național București – 2003–2004
Yero Bello – FC Vaslui – 2010–2012
Prince Chukwunyere – Oțelul Galați – 2001–2002
Gideon Ebijitimi – Oțelul Galați – 2001–2002
Ifeanyi Emeghara – Politehnica Timișoara, Steaua București – 2005–2008, 2009–2012
Dino Eze – Gloria Buzău – 2007–2009
Kehinde Fatai – Farul Constanța, Astra Giurgiu, Argeș Pitești – 2007–2009, 2010–2015, 2019–2022
Haruna Garba – FC Voluntari – 2020–2021
John Ibeh – UTA Arad, Oțelul Galați, Pandurii Târgu Jiu – 2008–2013
Christian Irobiso – Gaz Metan Mediaș, Dinamo București, Petrolul Ploiești – 2021–
Benjamin Kuku – ASA Târgu Mureș, FC Botoșani, Sepsi Sfântu Gheorghe – 2016–2018
Henry Makinwa – Rapid București – 2002–2003
Samson Nwabueze – Pandurii Târgu Jiu – 2016–2017
Anthony Nwakaeme – Universitatea Cluj, Petrolul Ploiești – 2010–2013
Nwankwo Obiora – CFR Cluj – 2012–2014
Christian Obodo – Concordia Chiajna, Pandurii Târgu Jiu – 2015–2017
Michael Odibe – Concordia Chiajna – 2015–2016
Ibezito Ogbonna – CFR Cluj – 2007–2008
Derick Ogbu – CFR Cluj – 2013–2014 
Gbenga Okunowo – Dinamo București – 2003–2004
Peter Omoduemuke – Politehnica Timișoara, Ceahlăul Piatra Neamţ – 2006–2008
Michael Omoh – Politehnica Iași, Academica Clinceni, Farul Constanța – 2019–2020, 2021–2022
Gomo Onduku – Concordia Chiajna, CSMS Iași – 2013–2016
Benjamin Onwuachi – Oțelul Galați – 2014–2015
Godwin Onyeka – Pandurii Târgu Jiu – 2012–2013
Wisdom Onyekwere – Național București – 2003–2004
Philip Otele – UTA Arad – 2021–
Michael Tukura – FC Vaslui – 2012–2013
Simon Zenke – Dinamo București – 2018–2019

North Macedonia
Besart Abdurahimi – FC Hermannstadt – 2018–2019
Viktor Angelov – FC Voluntari – 2020–2022
Stefan Aškovski – FC Botoșani, Sepsi Sfântu Gheorghe – 2019–
David Babunski – FC Botoșani, Viitorul Constanța  – 2019–2021
Egzon Belica – Concordia Chiajna – 2012–2013
Mite Cikarski – Gaz Metan Mediaș – 2018–2020
Hristijan Dragarski – Concordia Chiajna – 2014–2015
Jane Gavalovski – FC Universitatea Craiova – 2004–2005
Daniel Georgievski – Steaua București – 2012–2014
Slavčo Georgievski – CFR Cluj – 2004–2005
Filip Gligorov – Dunărea Călărași – 2018–2019
Stojan Ignatov – Politehnica Iași – 2008–2010
Blazhe Ilijoski – FC Brașov, Rapid București – 2011–2013
Mirko Ivanovski – Astra Giurgiu, CFR Cluj, Dinamo București, Petrolul Ploiești – 2012–2015, 2021–
Hristijan Kirovski – FC Vaslui – 2008–2009
Gjorgji Mojsov – Oțelul Galați – 2009–2010
Kristijan Naumovski – Dinamo București – 2010–2015
Nderim Nexhipi – FC Vaslui – 2012–2013
Boban Nikolov – Viitorul Constanța – 2012–2015
Petar Petkovski – FC Botoșani – 2021–
Milovan Petrovikj – Sepsi Sfântu Gheorghe – 2017–2018
Agron Rufati – Academica Clinceni – 2021–2022
Dušan Savić – FC Brașov – 2009–2010
Jurica Siljanoski – Bihor Oradea – 2003–2004
Marko Simonovski – Sepsi Sfântu Gheorghe, FC Voluntari – 2017–2020
Aco Stojkov – FC Botoșani – 2013–2014
Filip Timov – Concordia Chiajna – 2014–2015
Blagoja Todorovski – Dinamo București – 2007–2008
Krste Velkoski – Ceahlăul Piatra Neamț – 2009–2010
Suat Zendeli – Petrolul Ploiești – 2011–2012

Norway
Gudmund Kongshavn – Dinamo București – 2020–2021

Panama
Armando Cooper – Oțelul Galați, Dinamo București – 2013–2014, 2018–2019
Jaime Penedo – Dinamo București – 2016–2019

Paraguay
Miguel Cuéllar – CFR Cluj – 2006–2007
César Meza – CS Universitatea Craiova – 2018–2019
David Meza – Argeș Pitești – 2020–
José Montiel – Politehnica Iași – 2008–2009

Peru
John Galliquio – Dinamo București – 2007–2008
Andrés Mendoza – Steaua București – 2007–2008
Julio Landauri – FC Brașov – 2009–2010

Philippines
Daisuke Sato – Politehnica Iași, Sepsi Sfântu Gheorghe – 2016–2019
Álvaro Silva – Petrolul Ploiești – 2011–2012

Poland

Kamil Bilinski – Dinamo București – 2013–2015
Piotr Celeban – FC Vaslui – 2012–2014
Adrian Cierpka – CS Mioveni – 2021–
Łukasz Gikiewicz – FCSB – 2019–2020
Michał Gliwa – Pandurii Târgu Jiu – 2013–2015
Janusz Gol – Dinamo București – 2020–2021
Paweł Golański – Steaua București, ASA Târgu Mureș – 2007–2010, 2015–2016
Rafał Grzelak – Steaua București – 2009–2010
Łukasz Kubik – Argeș Pitești – 2003–2004
Piotr Polczak – Astra Giurgiu – 2017–2018
Sebastian Rudol – Sepsi Sfântu Gheorghe – 2018–2019
Grzegorz Sandomierski – CFR Cluj – 2019–2021
Łukasz Szukała – Gloria Bistrița, Universitatea Cluj, Petrolul Ploiești, Steaua București – 2010–2015
Paweł Tomczyk – CS Mioveni – 2021–2022
Jakub Wilk – FC Vaslui – 2013–2014
Hubert Wołąkiewicz – Astra Giurgiu – 2014–2015

Portugal

Paulo Adriano – FC Brașov – 2008–2009
Geraldo Alves – Steaua București, Petrolul Ploiești, Astra Giurgiu – 2010–2017
Ricardo Alves – Concordia Chiajna, Astra Giurgiu – 2014–2017
Ricardo Alves Silva – Rapid București – 2014–2015
Eurípedes Amoreirinha – CFR Cluj, UTA Arad – 2007–2008
Diogo Andrade – UTA Arad – 2007–2008
João Paulo Andrade – Rapid București – 2008–2009
Luís Aurélio – Gaz Metan Mediaș, CFR Cluj – 2018–2021
Ricardo Batista – Gaz Metan Mediaș – 2018–2020
Beto – CFR Cluj – 2011–2012
Fábio Braga – CSMS Iași – 2014–2015
Jaime Bragança – FC Vaslui, Gloria Bistrița, Corona Brașov – 2011–2014
Gonçalo Brandão – CFR Cluj – 2013–2014
Rúben Brígido – Oțelul Galați – 2014–2015
Vítor Bruno – CFR Cluj – 2015–2016
David Bruno – Astra Giurgiu – 2019–2021
Ricardo Cadú – CFR Cluj – 2006–2014
David Caiado – Gaz Metan Mediaș, FC Hermannstadt – 2017–2021
Mário Camora – CFR Cluj – 2011–
Mário Carlos – Farul Constanța – 2005–2006
Hélder Castro – ASA Târgu Mureș – 2014–2015
Pedro Celestino – CFR Cluj – 2011–2013
Chico – Farul Constanța – 2007–2009
Nuno Claro – CFR Cluj, ACS Poli Timișoara – 2007–2012, 2013–2014
Dani Coelho – CFR Cluj – 2015–2016
João Coimbra – Rapid București – 2014–2015
Cândido Costa – Rapid București – 2010–2011
Dani – CFR Cluj – 2006–2011
Davide Dias – FC Brașov, FC Vaslui – 2011–2014
Luís Dias – Gloria Buzău – 2008–2009
João Diogo – Gaz Metan Mediaș – 2017–2018
Nuno Diogo – CS Otopeni, FC Brașov, CFR Cluj – 2008–2013
Bocar Djumo – Oțelul Galați – 2013–2014
André Duarte – FC U Craiova – 2022–
Rui Duarte – FC Brașov, Rapid București – 2008–2013
Danny Esteves – Academica Clinceni – 2019–2020
Filipe Falardo – Gloria Buzău – 2008–2009
Mário Felgueiras – FC Brașov, CFR Cluj – 2011–2015
Daniel Fernandes – CFR Cluj – 2011–2012
Ricardo Fernandes – Rapid București – 2008–2010
Vasco Fernandes – Pandurii Târgu Jiu – 2015–2016
Tiago Ferreira – CS Universitatea Craiova – 2017–2020
Cristiano Figueiredo – FC Hermannstadt, Dinamo București – 2019–2022
Diogo Fonseca – FC Brașov – 2013–2014
Carlos Fortes – Gaz Metan Mediaș, CS Universitatea Craiova – 2018–2020
Fábio Fortes – FC Hermannstadt – 2020–2021
Fredy – CFR Cluj – 2006–2008
Nuno Gomes – FC Vaslui – 2006–2007
Tiago Gomes – Steaua București – 2008–2009
Guima – CFR Cluj – 2014–2017
Marian Huja – Petrolul Ploiești – 2022–
Diogo Izata – Gaz Metan Mediaș – 2021–2022
Joãozinho – Astra Giurgiu – 2014–2015
Artur Jorge – FCSB – 2017–2018
Paulo Jorge – Gaz Metan Mediaș – 2017–2018
Manuel José – CFR Cluj – 2006–2009
Edinho Júnior – Gaz Metan Mediaș – 2017–2018
Kikas – Rapid București – 2014–2015
André Leão – CFR Cluj – 2007–2010
Sérgio Leite – FC Vaslui – 2006–2007
Marcelo Lopes – FC Voluntari – 2020–
Tiago Lopes – CFR Cluj – 2013–2017
Jucie Lupeta – Argeș Pitești, FC Botoșani – 2021–2022
Hugo Luz – FC Vaslui – 2007–2012
Pedro Machado – FC U Craiova – 2021–2022
Ricardo Machado – FC Brașov, Dinamo București – 2011–2015
Bruno Madeira – FC Brașov, Concordia Chiajna – 2011–2017
Sérgio Marakis – Argeș Pitești – 2020–2021
Daniel Martins – Universitatea Cluj – 2014–2015
Vasco Matos – Rapid București – 2007–2008
João Meira – Concordia Chiajna – 2018–2019
Pedro Mendes – Politehnica Iași, Gaz Metan Mediaș – 2017–2019
André Micael – Gaz Metan Mediaș – 2018–2019
Bruno Miguel – Astra Giurgiu – 2011–2012
João Miguel – Argeș Pitești – 2021–2022
Rui Miguel – Astra Giurgiu, Rapid București – 2011–2012, 2014–2015
Carlos Milhazes – Politehnica Timișoara – 2007–2009
Pedro Mingote – Pandurii Târgu Jiu, ASA Târgu Mureș, CS Universitatea Craiova, SC Juventus București – 2007–2018
Pedro Moreira – FC Hermannstadt – 2018–2019
Hugo Moutinho – CS Turnu Severin, CSMS Iași – 2012–2013
Pedro Moutinho – FC Brașov – 2011–2012
Thierry Moutinho – CFR Cluj, FCSB – 2017–2020
Filipe Nascimento – CFR Cluj, Dinamo București, Politehnica Iași – 2015–2019
Emanuel Novo – FC Hermannstadt – 2019–2020
Filipe Oliveira – Sepsi Sfântu Gheorghe – 2017–2018
Pedro Oliveira – CFR Cluj, UTA Arad – 2006–2008
Marco Osório – Pandurii Târgu Jiu – 2005–2006
Paulinho – Astra Ploiești, Concordia Chiajna, Universitatea Cluj, Pandurii Târgu Jiu, Oțelul Galați – 2009–2015
João Pedro – Gloria Bistrița – 2008–2009
Rui Pedro – CFR Cluj – 2011–2014
Carlos Pintassilgo – Pandurii Târgu Jiu – 2007–2008
Miguel De Pina – Gloria Bistrița – 2010–2011
Ivo Pinto – CFR Cluj – 2012–2013
João Paulo Pinto – Rapid București – 2007–2010
André Pinto – Dinamo București – 2021–2022
Nuno Pinto – Astra Giurgiu – 2014–2015
Pedro Queirós – Gloria Bistrița, Astra Giurgiu – 2008–2009, 2015–2016
Diogo Ramos – Gloria Bistrița – 2008–2010
Ricardinho – FC Voluntari – 2018–
Diogo Rosado – Gaz Metan Mediaș – 2017–2018
Pedro Russiano – Gloria Buzău – 2008–2009
Diogo Salomão – Dinamo București, FCSB – 2017–2020
Idrisa Sambú – Gaz Metan Mediaș  – 2020–2021
André Santos – CS Universitatea Craiova – 2017–2018
Diogo Santos – FC Brașov – 2013–2015
Miguel Santos – Astra Giurgiu, Academica Clinceni – 2018–2020
Pedro Santos – Astra Giurgiu – 2013–2014
António Semedo – CFR Cluj, Steaua București, Unirea Urziceni – 2006–2011
Serginho – FC Brașov, Dinamo București – 2013–2015
Diogo Silva – Gloria Buzău, FC Brașov – 2008–2009, 2011–2012
Edson Silva – UTA Arad, Ceahlăul Piatra Neamț – 2006–2008, 2009–2010
Bruno Simão – UTA Arad, Dinamo București, Astra Ploiești – 2006–2010
Hugo Sousa – FC Brașov,  Astra Giurgiu, Sepsi Sfântu Gheorghe – 2011–2012, 2020–2022
Pedro Taborda – Politehnica Timișoara, FC Brașov – 2008–2011, 2012–2013
Afonso Taira – FC Hermannstadt – 2019–2020
Jorge Tavares – Gloria Buzău – 2008–2009
Filipe Teixeira – FC Brașov, Rapid București, Petrolul Ploiești, Astra Giurgiu, FCSB – 2010–2019
João Teixeira – Politehnica Iași – 2018–2020
Tony – CFR Cluj – 2006–2011
Diogo Valente – CFR Cluj – 2012–2013
Ricardo Valente – Gaz Metan Mediaș – 2020–2021
Diogo Viana – Argeș Pitești – 2021–2022
Fábio Vianna –  Argeș Pitești – 2022–
Hugo Vieira – FC U Craiova – 2021–2022
Vitinha – CFR Cluj, CS Otopeni, Unirea Alba Iulia, Concordia Chiajna – 2006–2007, 2008–2010, 2011–2012
Nuno Viveiros – Politehnica Iași, FC Brașov, FC Vaslui, Universitatea Cluj, CSMS Iași – 2008–2016
Yazalde – Astra Giurgiu, Gaz Metan Mediaș, FC Hermannstadt – 2013–2014, 2018–2021
Zé Manuel – Gaz Metan Mediaș – 2020–2021

Russia
Valentin Filatov – Unirea Urziceni – 2006–2007
Amir Natkho – Viitorul Constanța – 2018–2019
Yevgeni Shlyakov – UTA Arad – 2020–2022

Rwanda
Jimmy Mulisa – Ceahlăul Piatra Neamț – 2009–2010

Saint Lucia
Éric Fanis – Foresta Suceava – 1997–1999, 2000–2001

Saudi Arabia
Naif Hazazi – FC Botoșani – 2017–2018

Scotland
Scott Robertson – FC Botoșani – 2015–2016
Nick Ross – Sepsi Sfântu Gheorghe – 2017–2018

Senegal
Abdoulaye Ba – Dinamo București – 2020–2021
Issa Ba – FCM Târgu Mureș, Gaz Metan Mediaș, Dinamo București – 2010–2013
Papa Malick Ba – Dinamo București – 2008–2009
Ibrahima Baldé – CFR Cluj – 2017–2018
Oumar Diakhité – Sepsi Sfântu Gheorghe – 2019–2020
Pape Seydou Diop – Dinamo București – 2002–2003
Lys Gomis – ACS Poli Timișoara – 2015–2016
Magaye Gueye – Dinamo București – 2020–2021
Mansour Gueye – Politehnica Timișoara, Gloria Buzău, ACS Poli Timișoara – 2004–2011, 2013–2014
Souleymane Keita – Gloria Bistrița, CSMS Iași, ACS Poli Timișoara – 2009–2011, 2012–2014
Boubacar Mansaly – Dinamo București, Astra Giurgiu – 2012–2017
Gaston Mendy – Farul Constanța, Universitatea Cluj, Petrolul Ploiești, Rapid București, ASA Târgu Mureș, Dunărea Călărași – 2007–2009, 2010–2015, 2016–2017, 2018–2019
Pape N'Daw – Dinamo București – 2013–2014
Ousmane N'Doye – FC Vaslui, Dinamo București, Astra Ploiești, Săgeata Năvodari, ASA Târgu Mureș – 2007–2016
Mediop Ndiaye – Dunărea Călărași, Argeș Pitești – 2018–2019, 2020–2021
Ibrahima Niasse – Concordia Chiajna – 2015–2016
Mor Pouye – Gloria Bistrița – 2012–2013
Christian Sagna – Gloria Buzău – 2008–2009
Adama Sarr – Gaz Metan Mediaș – 2020–2022
Modou Sougou – CFR Cluj – 2011–2013
Emile Paul Tendeng – FC Vaslui – 2012–2013
Ousmane Thiandoum – Farul Constanța – 2002–2003
Issa Thiaw – Sepsi Sfântu Gheorghe – 2017–2018
Demba Touré – Astra Ploiești – 2011–2012

Serbia

Marko Anđelković – Viitorul Constanța – 2014–2015
Miodrag Anđelković – Pandurii Târgu Jiu, Internațional Curtea de Argeș – 2008–2010
Nikola Antić – Gaz Metan Mediaș – 2013–2014
Branko Baković – Politehnica Iași – 2007–2008
Marko Basara – Pandurii Târgu Jiu – 2009–2010
Zoran Belošević – Politehnica Timișoara, Universitatea Cluj – 2003–2004, 2010–2011
Miloš Bogdanović – Rapid București, Farul Constanța, Ceahlăul Piatra Neamț, Politehnica Iași – 2001–2006
Petar Bojić – Sepsi Sfântu Gheorghe – 2021–2022
Bojan Brać – CS Universitatea Craiova – 2014–2015
Dušan Brojčin – Bihor Oradea – 2003–2004
Sead Brunčević – CFR Cluj, Gloria Bistrița – 2004–2007
Milorad Bukvić – Oțelul Galați, Argeș Pitești, FC Vaslui – 2000–2003, 2005–2008
Dušan Čelar – Dinamo București – 2021–2022
Boban Cenić – Universitatea Cluj – 2010–2011
Uroš Ćosić – CS Universitatea Craiova – 2019–2020
Slaviša Čula – Dinamo București – 1996–1997
Goran Cvetković – Gloria Bistrița – 2005–2006
Miloš Deletić – Săgeata Năvodari – 2013–2014
Ranko Despotović – Rapid București – 2007–2008
Dušan Đokić – Astra Ploiești – 2009–2010
Ivan Đoković – UTA Arad – 2006–2008
Milan Đurić – Rapid București, Politehnica Timișoara – 2003–2004
Marko Gajić – FC U Craiova – 2021–2022
Njegoš Goločevac – Oţelul Galați – 2009–2010
Dragan Gošić – Farul Constanța – 2007–2009
Ivan Gvozdenović – Dinamo București – 2007–2008
Sead Hadžibulić – Gloria Bistrița – 2007–2008
Nikola Ignjatijević – Politehnica Timișoara – 2010–2011
Radiša Ilić – Național București – 2003–2004
Đorđe Ivelja – Rapid București – 2008–2010
Goran Janković – UTA Arad – 2006–2007
Slaviša Jeremić – Ceahlăul Piatra Neamț – 2009–2010
Nemanja Jovanović – Argeș Pitești, Pandurii Târgu Jiu, Universitatea Cluj, FC Vaslui, Unirea Alba Iulia – 2003–2004, 2006–2010
Bojan Jović – Ceahlăul Piatra Neamț – 2011–2015
Nikola Jozić – Gloria Buzău – 2007–2008
Sead Kolašinac – CFR Cluj – 2004–2005
Nikola Komazec – Petrolul Ploiești – 2011–2012
Predrag Lazić – CS Otopeni, Pandurii Târgu Jiu – 2008–2010
Leo Lerinc – Dinamo București – 2006–2007
Marko Ljubinković – FC Vaslui – 2006–2010
Zoran Ljubinković – Oțelul Galați – 2011–2013
Darko Marić – FC Brașov – 2004–2005
Miloš Marković – Ceahlăul Piatra Neamț – 2014–2015
Neven Marković – FC Vaslui – 2008–2010
Žarko Marković – Gaz Metan Mediaș – 2008–2014
Marko Marović – Gaz Metan Mediaș, ACS Poli Timișoara – 2009–2011, 2013–2014
Novak Martinović – Pandurii Târgu Jiu, Steaua București – 2008–2013
Ersin Mehmedović – Politehnica Timișoara, Național București, Unirea Urziceni, Dinamo București – 2004–2011
Dejan Mičić – Național București – 2001–2003
Miloš Mihajlov – Politehnica Iași – 2009–2010
Svetozar Mijin – CFR Cluj, Politehnica Iași – 2004–2008
Nemanja Milisavljević – FC Vaslui, Rapid București  – 2008–2013
Uroš Milosavljević – UTA Arad – 2006–2007
Zoran Milošević – CFR Cluj, Argeș Pitești – 2004–2007
Milan Mitić – CS Turnu Severin, Politehnica Iași, Gaz Metan Mediaș – 2012–2013, 2014–2018
Dalibor Mitrović – Argeș Piteşti – 2006–2007
Marko Momčilović – Pandurii Târgu Jiu, FCSB – 2013–2020
Danijel Morariju – ACS Poli Timișoara – 2013–2014
Ahmed Mujdragić – Gaz Metan Mediaș – 2014–2015
Slobodan Nedeljković – FC Universitatea Craiova – 1996–1997
Veljko Nikitović – FC Vaslui – 2007–2008
Ivan Paunović – FC Universitatea Craiova – 2009–2010
Miloš Pavlović – FC Vaslui, Rapid București – 2008–2013
Nino Pekarić – Dinamo București – 2007–2008
Milan Perendija – Oțelul Galați, Gaz Metan Mediaș – 2009–2013, 2017–2018
Dragan Perišić – Pandurii Târgu Jiu – 2005–2006
Slavko Perović – Dinamo București – 2019–2020
Dejan Pešić – FC Brașov, FC Vaslui – 2004–2006
Aleksandar Petrović – Petrolul Ploiești, Concordia Chiajna, ACS Poli Timișoara – 2011–2012, 2013–2014
Ivan Petrović – CSMS Iași – 2012–2013
Bogdan Planić – Steaua București – 2017–2020
Pavle Popara – Astra Ploiești – 2010–2011
Saša Popin – Pandurii Târgu Jiu, Săgeata Năvodari – 2012–2014
Milos Popović – CS Otopeni – 2008–2009
Bratislav Punoševac – Oțelul Galați – 2010–2013
Danilo Pustinjaković – Pandurii Târgu Jiu – 2005–2006
Branko Radovanović – UTA Arad – 2007–2008
Kenan Ragipović – Gloria Bistrița – 2007–2008
Predrag Ranđelović – FC Universitatea Craiova – 2003–2004
Milanko Rašković – Pandurii Târgu Jiu – 2008–2010
Dejan Rusmir – Ceahlăul Piatra Neamț, Farul Constanța – 2006–2009
Vladimir Sandulović – Național București – 2006–2007
Aleksandar Sarić – Politehnica Timișoara – 2002–2003
Boban Savić – Rapid București – 2002–2003
Dušan Šimić – Ceahlăul Piatra Neamț – 2006–2007
Sreten Sretenović – Politehnica Timișoara – 2008–2009
Sreten Stanić – Politehnica Timișoara, Dinamo București – 2005–2007
Rajko Stanković – Național București – 2005–2006
Aleksandar Stefanović – Bihor Oradea – 2003–2004
Borislav Stevanović – FC Universitatea Craiova – 2004–2005
Aleksandar Stoimirović – Petrolul Ploiești – 2011–2012
Boban Stojanović – UTA Arad – 2006–2007
Saša Stojanović – Universitatea Cluj – 2014–2015
Dejan Tričković – Argeș Pitești – 2000–2001
Jasmin Trtovac – Gloria Bistrița, Gaz Metan Mediaș – 2007–2008, 2010–2015, 2016–2017
Nikola Trujić – FC Botoșani – 2018–2019
Nikola Vasiljević – UTA Arad – 2006–2008
Nikola Vasiljević – Pandurii Târgu Jiu – 2014–2017
Srđan Vasiljević – Dinamo București – 2000–2001
Rade Veljović – CFR Cluj, Unirea Alba Iulia, FCM Târgu Mureș – 2008–2011
Nemanja Vidaković – Pandurii Târgu Jiu, Gaz Metan Mediaș – 2006–2007, 2008–2009
Đorđe Vlajić – CFR Cluj – 2004–2005
Vojislav Vranjković – Pandurii Târgu Jiu, Dinamo București, Ceahlăul Piatra Neamț, CS Turnu Severin, Corona Brașov – 2005–2011, 2012–2014
Ivan Vukadinović – Gaz Metan Mediaș – 2010–2013
Branislav Vukomanović – Farul Constanța – 2008–2009
Srđan Žakula – Unirea Urziceni – 2007–2008
Miloš Živković – FC Botoșani – 2013–2014

Sierra Leone
Musa Kallon – Sportul Studențesc București – 1995–1996
Jonathan Morsay – Dinamo București – 2020–2021
Julius Wobay – FC Universitatea Craiova – 2006–2011

Slovakia

Balázs Borbély – Politehnica Timișoara – 2007–2010
Miloš Brezinský – Politehnica Timișoara – 2007–2010
Marián Čišovský – Politehnica Timișoara – 2008–2011
Peter Čvirik  – Universitatea Cluj – 2010–2011
Pavol Farkaš – FC Vaslui – 2008–2012
Peter Gál-Andrezly – Sepsi Sfântu Gheorghe – 2019–2021
Karol Karlík – Oţelul Galaţi – 2014–2015
Marián Kello – Astra Giurgiu – 2012–2013
Kristián Koštrna – Dinamo București – 2019–2020
Ján Kozák – Politehnica Timișoara  – 2009–2010
Michal Kubala – Gaz Metan Mediaș, Astra Ploiești – 2008–2012
Dušan Kuciak – FC Vaslui – 2008–2011
Peter Majerník – FC Brașov – 2010–2012
Adam Nemec – Dinamo București, FC Voluntari – 2016–2018, 2020–
Branislav Niňaj – Sepsi Sfântu Gheorghe – 2020–
Ivan Pecha – Ceahlăul Piatra Neamț, Oțelul Galați – 2007–2008, 2014–2015
Boris Peškovič – CFR Cluj – 2009–2010
Jaroslav Prekop – Gaz Metan Mediaș – 2010–2011
Pavol Šafranko –Sepsi Sfântu Gheorghe – 2019–2021
Lukáš Skovajsa – Dinamo București – 2019–2020
Denis Ventúra  – Academica Clinceni – 2019–2022
Robert Veselovsky  – Universitatea Cluj – 2013–2015
Tomáš Vestenický – Dinamo București – 2021–2022
Jakub Vojtuš  – Academica Clinceni, CFR Cluj,  Rapid București – 2019–2021
Jan Zolna – FC Vaslui – 2006–2007

Slovenia

Dominik Beršnjak – Politehnica Iași – 2007–2010
Milan Kocić – FC Voluntari, Chindia Târgoviște  – 2019–2022
Rok Kronaveter – Petrolul Ploiești – 2014–2015
Anej Lovrečič – FC Vaslui – 2013–2014
Darijan Matić – Rapid București – 2009–2010
Miha Mevlja – Dinamo București – 2015–2017
Nejc Mevlja – Pandurii Târgu Jiu – 2014–2015
Marko Nunić – Dinamo București – 2021–2022
Jan Pahor – Farul Constanța – 2008–2009
Andrej Pečnik – Politehnica Iași – 2007–2010
Andrej Rastovac – Farul Constanța – 2008–2009
Rajko Rep – Sepsi Sfântu Gheorghe – 2021–2022
Dejan Rusič – Politehnica Timișoara – 2007–2009
Nejc Skubic – Oțelul Galați – 2011–2012
Jaka Štromajer – Pandurii Târgu Jiu, Oțelul Galați – 2007–2013 
Andraž Struna – FC Voluntari – 2019–2020
Nikola Tolimir – Ceahlăul Piatra Neamț – 2012–2013
Dare Vršič – Politehnica Timișoara – 2007–2010

South Africa
May Mahlangu – Dinamo București – 2016–2019

South Korea
Kim Gil-sik – Oțelul Galați – 2006–2008
Park Jae-hong – Universitatea Cluj – 2007–2008

Spain

Noé Acosta – Universitatea Cluj – 2010–2011
Aloisio – Ceahlăul Piatra Neamț – 2012–2013
Raúl Albentosa – Dinamo București – 2020–2021
Ibón Pérez Arrieta – Pandurii Târgu Jiu – 2007–2010
Alfonso Artabe – FC Voluntari – 2018–2019
Ángel Bastos – FC Hermannstadt – 2020–2021
Jefté Betancor – FC Voluntari, Farul Constanța, CFR Cluj – 2020–
David Bollo – Academica Clinceni – 2019–2020
Aritz Borda – Rapid București – 2014–2015
Josemi Castañeda – Viitorul Constanța, Farul Constanța – 2020–2022
Juan Cámara – Dinamo București, CS Universitatea Craiova – 2020–2021
Alejandro Campano  – FC Vaslui – 2010–2011
Raúl del Campo – Gaz Metan Mediaș – 2010–2011
Fernando Carralero – FC Botoșani – 2015–2016
José Casado – FC Botoșani – 2015–2016
Carlos Casquero – FCM Târgu Mureș – 2010–2011
Biel Company – FC Hermannstadt – 2018–2019
Albert Dalmau – Sepsi Sfântu Gheorghe – 2017–2018
Roberto Delgado – FC Vaslui, Universitatea Cluj – 2009–2011
Didac Devesa – Politehnica Iași – 2019–2020
Edu Espada – FCM Târgu Mureș – 2010–2011
Jesús Fernández – CFR Cluj, Sepsi Sfântu Gheorghe – 2018–2021
Victor Fernández – Viitorul Constanța,  FC Botoșani – 2020–2021
Walter Fernández – Petrolul Ploiești – 2013–2014
Fonsi – Săgeata Năvodari – 2013–2014
Adrià Gallego – Politehnica Iași – 2018–2020
Aritz López Garai – Rapid București – 2014–2015
Aleix García – Dinamo București – 2020–2021
Boris Garrós – Politehnica Iași – 2018–2019
Jon Gaztañaga – Viitorul Constanța – 2020–2021
Abel Gómez – Steaua București – 2008–2009
Eder González – Sepsi Sfântu Gheorghe – 2020–2022
Iván González – ASA Târgu Mureș – 2014–2016
Emilio Guerra – Săgeata Năvodari – 2013–2014
Javi Hernández – ACS Poli Timișoara – 2015–2016
Rubén Jurado – ASA Târgu Mureș – 2015–2016
Marcos Lavín – FC Voluntari – 2020–2021
Fernando Llorente – ACS Poli Timișoara – 2015–2017
Cristian López – CFR Cluj – 2015–2017
Daniel López – Viitorul Constanța – 2016–2018
Isma López – Dinamo București – 2020–2021
Pablo de Lucas – Petrolul Ploiești, Viitorul Constanța, FC Voluntari, Argeș Pitești  – 2013–2016, 2019–2021
Ángel Martínez – Viitorul Constanța  – 2020–2021
David Mayoral – FC Hermannstadt – 2020–2021
Tomás Mejías – Dinamo București – 2020–2021
Rubén Miño – Politehnica Iași – 2018–2019
Francisco Molinero – Dinamo București – 2009–2010
Aitor Monroy – Ceahlăul Piatra Neamț, CFR Cluj, Dinamo București, Dunărea Călărași – 2011–2015, 2017–2019
Antonio Moreno – Ceahlăul Piatra Neamț – 2012–2013
Borja Navarro – Săgeata Năvodari – 2013–2014
Eduard Oriol – Rapid București – 2014–2015
Joan Oriol – Rapid București – 2014–2015
Armiche Ortega – Pandurii Târgu Jiu – 2016–2017
César Ortiz – FC Vaslui – 2013–2014
Juan Carlos Real – CFR Cluj – 2015–2017
David Rivas – FC Vaslui – 2010–2011
Alex Rodriguez – Sepsi Sfântu Gheorghe – 2017–2018
Julio Rodríguez – FC Voluntari – 2019–2020
René Román – Dinamo București – 2020–2021
José Romera – Dinamo București – 2016–2018
Óscar Rubio – Dinamo București – 2010–2011
David Sánchez – Politehnica Timișoara, Gloria Buzău – 2008–2009
Rufino Segovia – ACS Poli Timișoara – 2015–2016
Abel Suárez – ACS Poli Timișoara – 2015–2016
Manu Torres – ACS Poli Timișoara – 2015–2016
Borja Valle – Dinamo București – 2020–2021
Fernando Velasco – Petrolul Ploiești – 2015–2016
Javier Velayos – FC Brașov, CFR Cluj, ASA Târgu Mureș – 2011–2017
Urko Vera – CFR Cluj, Astra Giurgiu – 2017–2019

Sudan
Yasin Hamed – ASA Târgu Mureș, Pandurii Târgu Jiu, Sepsi Sfântu Gheorghe – 2016–2020

Suriname
Nicandro Breeveld – Gaz Metan Mediaș, Pandurii Târgu Jiu, Steaua București, Politehnica Iași – 2011–2016, 2019–2021

Sweden
Admir Bajrovic – Sepsi Sfântu Gheorghe – 2020–2021
Valmir Berisha – Chindia Târgoviște – 2019–2021
Mikael Dorsin – CFR Cluj – 2007–2008
Darko Lukanović – Voința Sibiu, Ceahlăul Piatra Neamț – 2011–2013
Niklas Sandberg – CFR Cluj – 2007–2008

Switzerland
Orhan Ademi – UTA Arad – 2022–
Matteo Fedele – CS Universitatea Craiova – 2018–2019, 2020–2022
Goran Karanović – Sepsi Sfântu Gheorghe, FC Hermannstadt – 2019–2021
Cephas Malele – Argeș Pitești – 2020–2021
Ivan Martić – CS Universitatea Craiova – 2017–2020, 2022–
Miodrag Mitrović – CS Universitatea Craiova – 2017–2018
Janko Pacar – Petrolul Ploiești – 2015–2016
Simone Rapp – Sepsi Sfântu Gheorghe – 2020–2021
Gëzim Shalaj – Pandurii Târgu Jiu, Dinamo București – 2014–2016
Henry Siqueira-Barras – Argeș Pitești, Gloria Bistrița – 2006–2007
Danijel Subotić – FC Universitatea Craiova, ASA Târgu Mureș, Dinamo București – 2010–2012, 2018–2019
Sébastien Wüthrich – Astra Giurgiu – 2020–2021

Syria
Mahmoud Al-Mawas – FC Botoșani – 2020–2021
Aias Aosman – FC Hermannstadt – 2020–2021

Tajikistan
Iskandar Dzhalilov – CS Turnu Severin – 2012–2013

Togo
Camaldine Abraw – ACS Poli Timișoara – 2017–2018
Charles Acolatse – SC Juventus București – 2017–2018
Samuel Asamoah – FC U Craiova – 2021–
Serge Akakpo – FC Vaslui – 2008–2010
Zanzan Atte-Oudeyi – CS Otopeni – 2008–2009
Abbe Ibrahim – Ceahlăul Piatra Neamț – 2009–2010
Daré Nibombé – CS Otopeni, Politehnica Timișoara – 2008–2010
Serge Nyuiadzi – Astra Giurgiu – 2017–2018

Tunisia
Selim Ben Djemia – Petrolul Ploiești, Astra Giurgiu, Dunărea Călărași – 2011–2013, 2018–2019
Syam Ben Youssef – Astra Giurgiu,  CFR Cluj – 2012–2015, 2020–2021
Zied Bhairi – Gloria Bistrița – 2008–2009
Haykel Guemamdia – Ceahlăul Piatra Neamț – 2007–2008
Aïssa Laïdouni – FC Voluntari – 2018–2020
Sofien Moussa – Petrolul Ploiești, Concordia Chiajna, FC Botoșani, Academica Clinceni – 2015–2016, 2018–2020
Hamza Younés – Petrolul Ploiești – 2011–2014

Turkey
Ayhan Güçlü – FC Brașov – 2012–2013
Gökhan Kardeş – SC Juventus București – 2017–2018
Hakan Sedat – Astra Ploiești – 2002–2003
Bülent Seyrun – Astra Ploiești – 2002–2003
Ersin Veli – Ceahlăul Piatra Neamț – 2009–2010

Uganda
Luwagga Kizito – Politehnica Iași – 2017–2019

Ukraine
Vitaliy Balytskyi – CFR Cluj – 2004–2005
Andriy Fedorenko – Ceahlăul Piatra Neamț – 2006–2007
Ihor Lytovka – FC Voluntari – 2015–2016
Artem Milevskyi – Concordia Chiajna – 2015–2016
Júnior Moraes – Gloria Bistrița – 2009–2011
Artem Semenenko – CSMS Iași – 2012–2013
Denis Sytnik – Petrolul Ploiești – 2011–2012
Nikolai Zbarach – Petrolul Ploiești – 2003–2004

United States
Steve Reese – Politehnica Timișoara – 2002–2003

Uruguay

Giorginho Aguirre – Corona Brașov – 2013–2014
Matías Aguirregaray – CFR Cluj – 2012–2013
Juan Albín – Petrolul Ploiești, Dinamo București – 2013–2015, 2017–2018
Maximiliano Arias – Astra Ploiești – 2009–2010
Dionisio Cabrera – FC Vaslui – 2005–2006
Pablo Ceppelini – Universitatea Cluj – 2014–2015
Diego Ciz – Rapid București – 2009–2010
Silvio Dorrego – FC Botoșani – 2013–2014
Darío Flores – CFR Cluj – 2008–2010
Sebastián Gallegos – Petrolul Ploiești – 2014–2015
Mauro Goicoechea – Oțelul Galați – 2013–2014
Walter López – FC Universitatea Craiova – 2010–2011
Facundo Mallo – Dinamo București – 2018–2019
Marcelo Méndez – Astra Ploiești – 2009–2010
Rodrigo Pastorini – Petrolul Ploiești – 2014–2015
Álvaro Pereira – CFR Cluj – 2008–2009
Nicolás Rodríguez – Corona Brașov – 2013–2014
Diego Silva – Astra Ploiești – 2009–2010
Cristian Sosa – FCM Târgu Mureș – 2010–2011
Agustín Viana – CFR Cluj – 2008–2009

Venezuela
Rafael Acosta – Politehnica Iași – 2020–2021
Gualberto Campos – Dinamo București – 2008–2009
Alexander González – Dinamo București – 2020–2021
Ricardo Páez – Politehnica Timișoara – 2005–2006
Mario Rondón – Gaz Metan Mediaș, CFR Cluj, Sepsi Sfântu Gheorghe – 2017–2021, 2022–
Jorge Luis Ruiz – ACS Poli Timișoara – 2013–2014
Franco Signorelli – FC Voluntari – 2018–2020

Zambia
Fwayo Tembo – Astra Giurgiu – 2012–2016

Zimbabwe
Mike Temwanjera – FC Vaslui – 2006–2014

Notes

External links
Romaniansoccer.ro Foreign players

 
Romania
 
Association football player non-biographical articles